= List of mechanical keyboards =

Mechanical keyboards (or mechanical-switch keyboards) are computer keyboards which have an individual switch for each key.

The following table is a compilation list of mechanical keyboard models, brands, and series:

== Mechanical keyboards ==
Keyboard name	Switch type	Ergonomic	Connection type	USB Hub	Backlight	Key rollover	Other notes
AsusTek ROG	Cherry	No	USB	No	Yes	Unlimited	
Atreus	Matias	Yes	USB	No	No	Unlimited	
AZIO Cascade	Gateron	No	USB & Bluetooth	No	Yes	Unlimited	75% keyboard (without the numpad), 100% keyboard available at March 2023
Cherry	Cherry	No	USB	Yes	No	Unlimited	
Clevy	Alps	Yes	USB & Bluetooth	No	No	Unlimited	Assistive Largekey Keyboard
Code Keyboard	Cherry	No	USB	No	Yes	Unlimited	
Cooler Master	Cherry	No	USB	No	Yes	Unlimited	
Corsair	Cherry	No	USB	No	Yes	Unlimited	
Das Keyboard	Cherry	No	USB	Yes	Yes	Unlimited	
Ducky	Cherry / Kailh / Gateron	No	USB	No	Yes	Unlimited	
Diatec / Filco	Cherry	No	USB	No	No	Unlimited	
GMMK	Gateron / Kailh	No	USB	No	Yes	Unlimited	
Happy Hacking Keyboard	Capacitive - Topre	No	USB	Yes	No	Unlimited	
HyperX Alloy FPS	Cherry	No	USB	No	Yes	Unlimited	
IBM Model F	Capacitive - Buckling spring	No	XT, AT	No	No	Unlimited	No longer manufactured. Model F Labs is the modern equivalent.
IBM Model M	Buckling spring	No	XT, AT, PS/2	No	No	2	No longer manufactured. Unicomp is the modern equivalent.
iKBC	Cherry	No	USB	No	Yes	Unlimited	
Input Club	Personalized / Silo Beam	Yes	USB	No	Yes	Unlimited	Open source. / Analog input and Hall Effect switches.
KBParadise	Matias / Cherry	No	USB	No	Yes	Unlimited	
Keyboardio	Matias	Yes	USB	No	Yes	Unlimited	Solid maple body.
Keychron	Gateron	No	USB, Bluetooth	No	Yes	Unlimited	
Keyed Up Labs	Cherry	No	USB	No	No	Unlimited	
Launch	Kailh	No	USB	Yes	Yes	Unlimited	Open source
Logitech G	Omron / Kailh	No	USB	No	Yes	Unlimited	
Leopold	Capacitive - Topre / Cherry	No	USB	No	No	Unlimited	
Matias	Matias	Yes	USB	Yes	No	Unlimited	Formerly Alps, now a Matias Alps-style reproduction.
Model F Labs	Capacitive - Buckling spring	No	USB	No	No	Unlimited	
Model F Labs Beam Spring	Beam Spring	No	USB	No	No	Unlimited	
Niztech	Capacitive - Niz EC	No	USB	No	No	Unlimited	
Northgate OmniKey	Alps SKCM White	No	AT	No	No	?	No longer manufactured.
NuPhy	Magnetic - Gateron / Gateron	No	USB & Bluetooth	Yes	Yes	Unlimited	USB hub for use with 2.4GHz peripherals.
OLKB	Personalized	No	USB	No	No	Unlimited	Open source. DIY.
Razer	Razer	No	USB	No	Yes	Unlimited	
ROCCAT Vulcan	ROCCAT Titan	No	USB	No	Yes	Unlimited	
SteelSeries Apex	SteelSeries	No	USB	No	Yes	Unlimited	
splitted.space	Cherry / Kailh / Gateron	Yes	USB, Bluetooth	No	Yes	Unlimited	
Thermaltake Tt eSPORTS	Cherry	No	USB	No	Yes	Unlimited	
Topre Realforce	Capacitive - Topre	No	USB	No	No	Unlimited	
Unicomp	Buckling spring	No	USB, PS/2	No	No	2	
UNIQEY	Cherry	No	USB	No	No	Unlimited	
Varmilo	Cherry	No	USB	No	Yes	Unlimited	
Vortex	Cherry	No	USB	No	No	Unlimited	
WASD	Cherry	No	USB	No	Yes	Unlimited	
Wooting	Adomax Flaretech / Lekker	No	USB	No	Yes	Unlimited	Analog input and optoelectronic switches. / Analog input and Hall Effect switches.
XMIT	?	No	USB	No	Yes	Unlimited	Hall Effect switches.
Planck EZ	Cherry / Kailh	No	USB	No	No	Unlimited	Free and open-source firmware, ortholinear
ErgoDox EZ	Cherry / Kailh	Yes	USB	No	Optional	Unlimited	Free and open-source firmware, split, columnar
Moonlander Mark I	Cherry / Kailh	Yes	USB	No	Yes	Unlimited	Free and open-source firmware, split, columnar
ABS M1	Alps SKBM Black	No	USB	No	No	?	No longer manufactured
Epomaker Hack59	Epomaker Flamingo Switch	No	USB-C	No	Yes	?	Layout not longer used
