= Das Keyboard =

Series of computer mechanical keyboards sold by Metadot Corporation

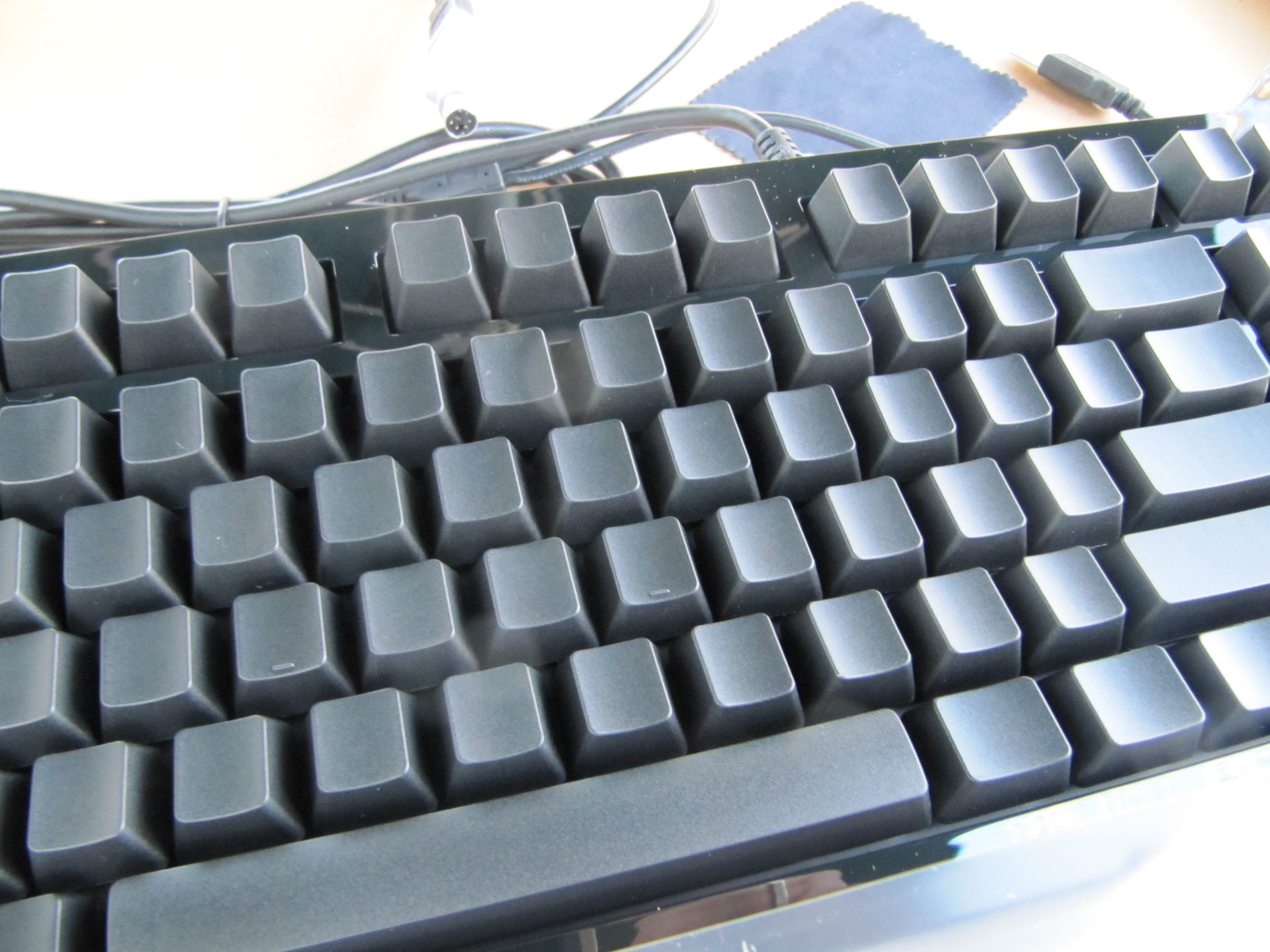
Example of the Das Keyboard, model S Ultimate (unlabelled)

Das Keyboard is a series of computer keyboards sold by Metadot Corporation, a software company located in Austin, Texas.

== Overview ==
The "Ultimate" designation on models refers to keyboards with blank keycaps designed to improve touch typing skills. The "Professional" variants are no different from the Ultimate variants, save for the former having legends on the keycaps. The current iterations employ mechanical keyswitches manufactured by either Cherry or Greetech.

== Iterations ==
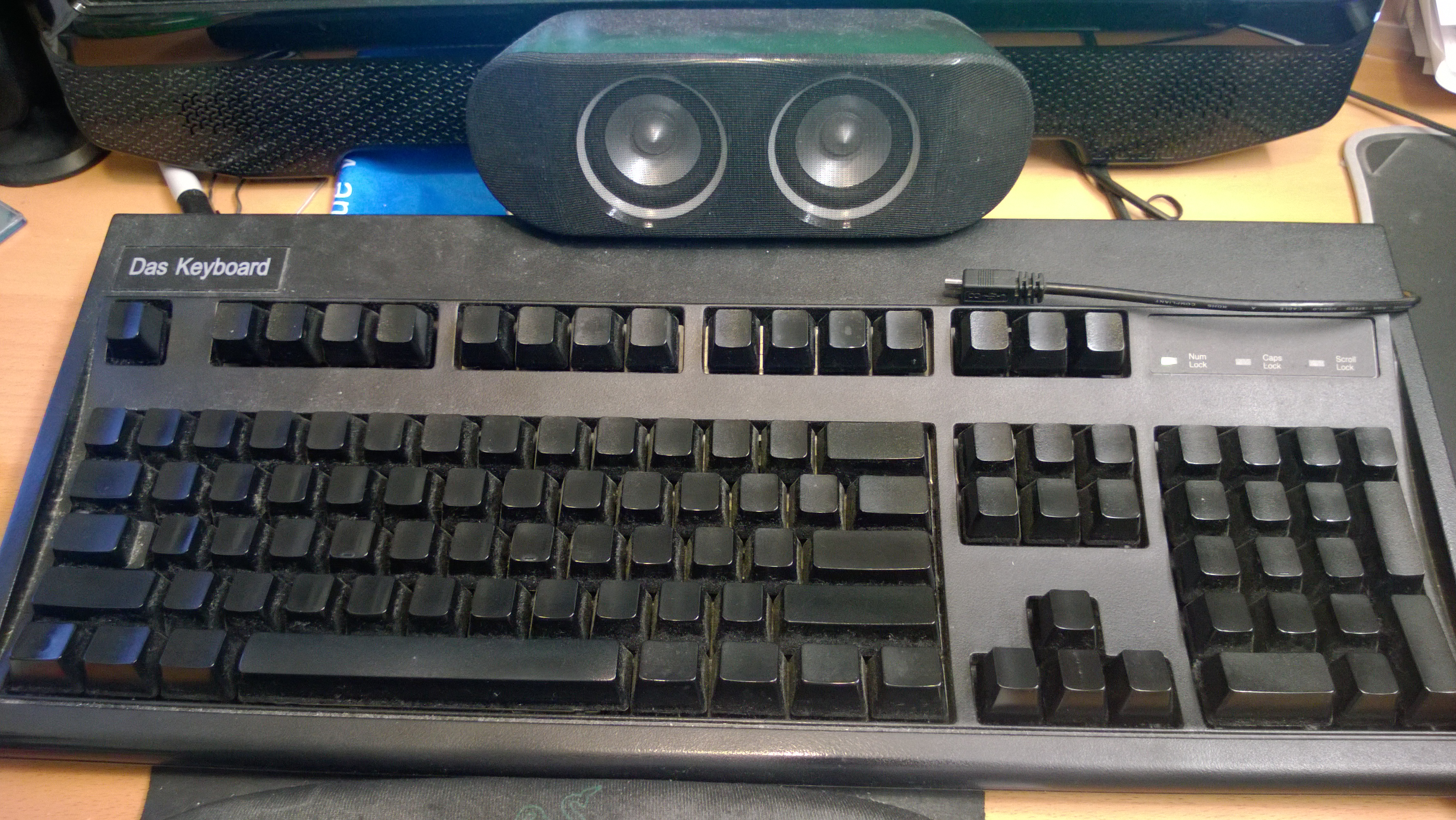
Example of the Das Keyboard, Version 1

The first iteration, released in 2005, did not feature mechanical key switches. Still, in addition to the blank keycaps, it featured a Model-M-inspired design and keys with individual weights that require varying amounts of force to press.

The second iteration in 2006 introduced mechanical key switches using Cherry MX Blue switches.

The third iteration in 2008 was the first to be offered in both Ultimate (unlabeled) and Professional (labeled) versions. This USB-only keyboard also offered six-key rollover capability (the maximum for a conventional USB HID keyboard), an internal two-port USB hub, and a glossy surface. Both 104-key (ANSI) and 105-key layouts (ISO) were offered. It later became known that key transposition errors could occur at high typing speeds. In addition, interoperability issues related to the USB hub and lack of power were noticed with some systems.

The "Das Keyboard Model S" was introduced in late 2009. It contains revised electronics to address many common complaints, along with supporting media keys and PS/2 operation. Again, it is shipped in both the Ultimate (unlabeled) and Professional (labeled) versions, both 104- and 105-key, with the addition of a labeled Professional Silent model featuring non-clicky MX brown stem keyswitches. The latter is intended for applications that demand lower noise levels than those of the regular clicky MX blue stem switches, while retaining a similar tactile characteristic.

In 2015, some versions of Das Keyboards began shipping with Cherry MX clone switches manufactured by Greetech. The "Das Keyboard 4" for Windows continues to be sold with Cherry MX switches, but the Mac version and the "Das Keyboard 4C" models all feature the clone switches instead.

In June 2016, the "Das Keyboard 5Q" was introduced on Kickstarter. The new keyboard was to be cloud-connected, allowing online services to send signals to it that would trigger various lighting effects. Backers were promised delivery in January 2017, but Das Keyboard encountered a delay of over a year. Most backers did not receive their keyboards until the second quarter of 2018. The accompanying software only functions on Windows, despite the promise of full cross-platform support for Mac and Linux. The open source project DieFarbe, not endorsed by Das Keyboard, attempts to implement the Windows driver's feature set for other operating systems.

== See also ==
- Unicomp
- FrogPad
- Happy Hacking Keyboard
- Model M keyboard
- Optimus Maximus keyboard
- Touch typing
- Keyboard layout changer
