= Happy Hacking Keyboard =

Small computer keyboard

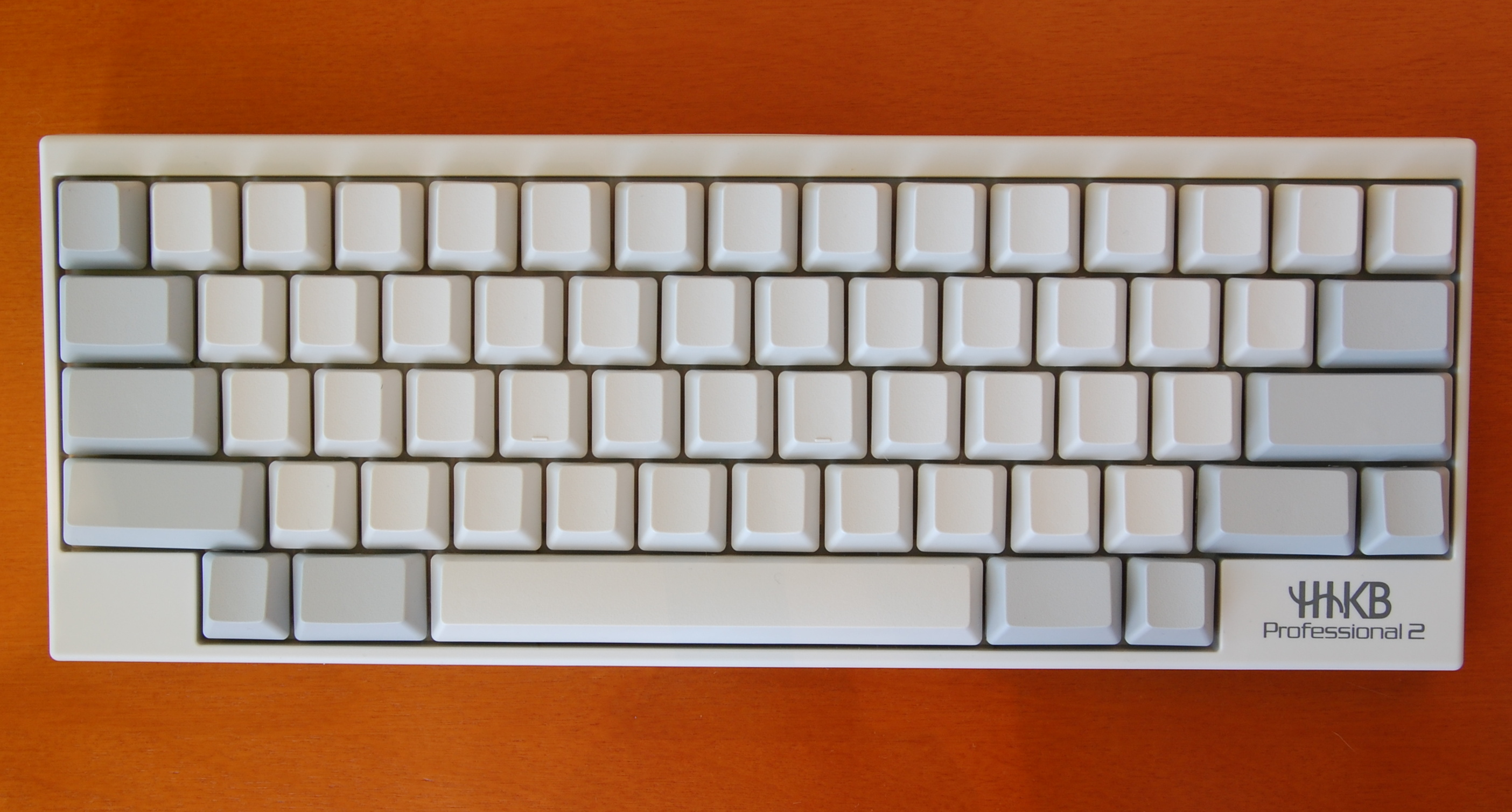
- A white Happy Hacking Keyboard Professional 2 with blank keycaps
- Manufacturer: PFU Limited
- Keyswitches: Depending on model: Membrane, capacitive
- Keycaps: Either dye-sublimated or blank PBT, ABS for spacebars on some models.
- Interface: Depending on model: PS/2, Sun, ADB, USB, Bluetooth
- Weight: approx. 500 g – depending on model
- Introduced: 20 December 1996; 29 years ago (original version) 24 April 2003; 23 years ago (HHKB Professional first-generation) 24 March 2006; 20 years ago (HHKB Professional second-generation) 10 December 2019; 6 years ago (HHKB Professional third-generation)
- Discontinued: 10 December 2006; 19 years ago (original version, HHKB Professional first-generation) 10 December 2019; 6 years ago (HHKB Professional second-generation)
- Website: happyhackingkb.com

The Happy Hacking Keyboard (HHKB) is a small computer keyboard produced by PFU Limited of Japan, codeveloped with Japanese computer scientist and pioneer Eiiti Wada. Its reduction of keys from the common 104-key layout down to 60 keys in the professional series is the basis for it having smaller overall proportions, yet full-sized keys. It returns the control key to its original position as on the early 84-key IBM Personal Computer/AT and XT layouts. The current models in production are the Happy Hacking Keyboard Professional Classic, Professional Hybrid (wired/wireless dual connectivity), Professional Hybrid Type-S (silenced variant of Hybrid), and Professional Classic Type-S (silenced variant of Classic) all in either dark or light colorschemes, and either blank or printed keycaps. Professional Hybrid models are also available in Japanese layout.

== History ==
=== Beginnings ===
Frustrated that each new computer system came with a new keyboard layout that became increasingly complex, Wada sought to create his own keyboard that he could continue to use with various different computer systems. Inspired by the original Macintosh keyboard, Professor Wada and PFU collaborated to design the Happy Hacking Keyboard with the following philosophy:

Because keyboards are accessories to PC makers, they focus on minimizing the manufacturing costs. But that’s incorrect. When America’s cowboys were in the middle of a trip and their horse died, they would leave the horse there. But even if they were in the middle of a desert, they would take their saddle with them. The horse was a consumable good, but the saddle was an interface that their bodies had gotten used to. In the same vein, PCs are consumable goods, while keyboards are important interfaces.

During the design process, Wada had mock-ups of the keyboard both with printed and blank keycaps; he found that his students quite liked blank keycaps and the tradition of HHKBs with blank keycaps continues to this day.

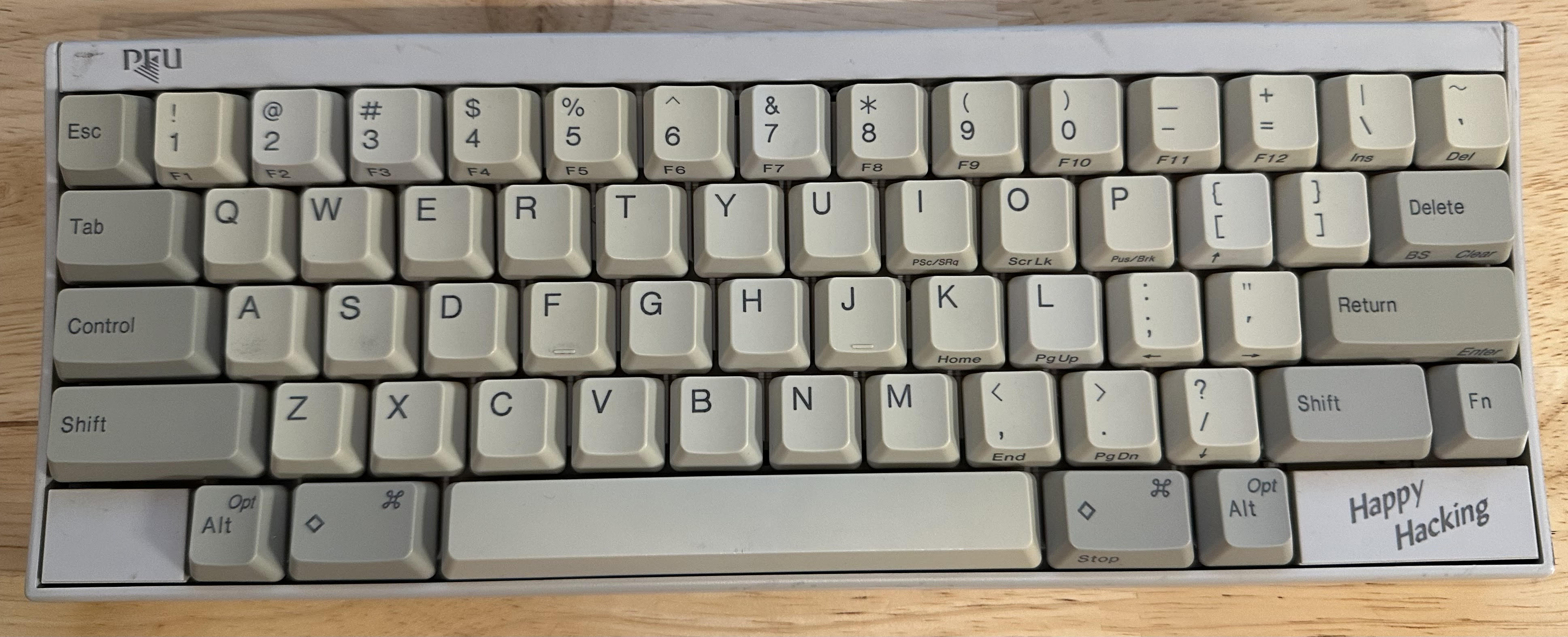
A first generation Happy Hacking Keyboard

The first Happy Hacking keyboard (HHKB) was released in 1996 and used membrane keyswitches. It used PS/2, Sun, and ADB interfaces to connect to a computer with a detachable cable and is only available in white. The first HHKB was followed by the release of the HHKB Lite and HHKB Lite2 in 1999 and 2001 respectively. The HHKB Lite models also used membrane keyswitches but have a slightly different layout than the standard HHKB. The HHKB Lite is the first HHKB model to be available in black and the HHKB Lite2 is the first HHKB model to use the USB interface.

=== HHKB Professional Series ===
==== First-generation ====
The first HHKB Professional (not to be confused with the previously mentioned first HHKB) was released in December 2003 and is available in either white or charcoal (black) colorways with either blank or printed keycaps. Retroactively known as the HHKB Professional 1, this is the first HHKB model to use the famous Topre electrostatic capacitive keyswitches that all subsequent models use to this day. It also features a detachable mini-USB cable which is used to connect the keyboard to a computer.

==== Second-generation ====
The HHKB Professional 2 was released in March 2006 and is also available in either white or charcoal (black) with either blank or printed keycaps. Its main feature is a built-in 2-port USB hub for connecting mice and other peripherals.

In 2011, PFU released the HHKB Professional 2 Type-S. Only available in white (but with either blank or printed keycaps), the HHKB Professional 2 Type-S is a silenced variant of the HHKB Professional 2 containing silenced Topre keyswitches.

Another variant of the HHKB Professional 2 called the HHKB Professional BT, was released in 2016. This is the first HHKB to feature Bluetooth connectivity. HHKB Professional BT models run on AA batteries housed in a "battery bump" on the rear of the keyboard and can only be connected using Bluetooth (although these models have a micro-USB port, it can only be used to power the keyboard in place of batteries and not for data transmission).

==== Third-generation ====
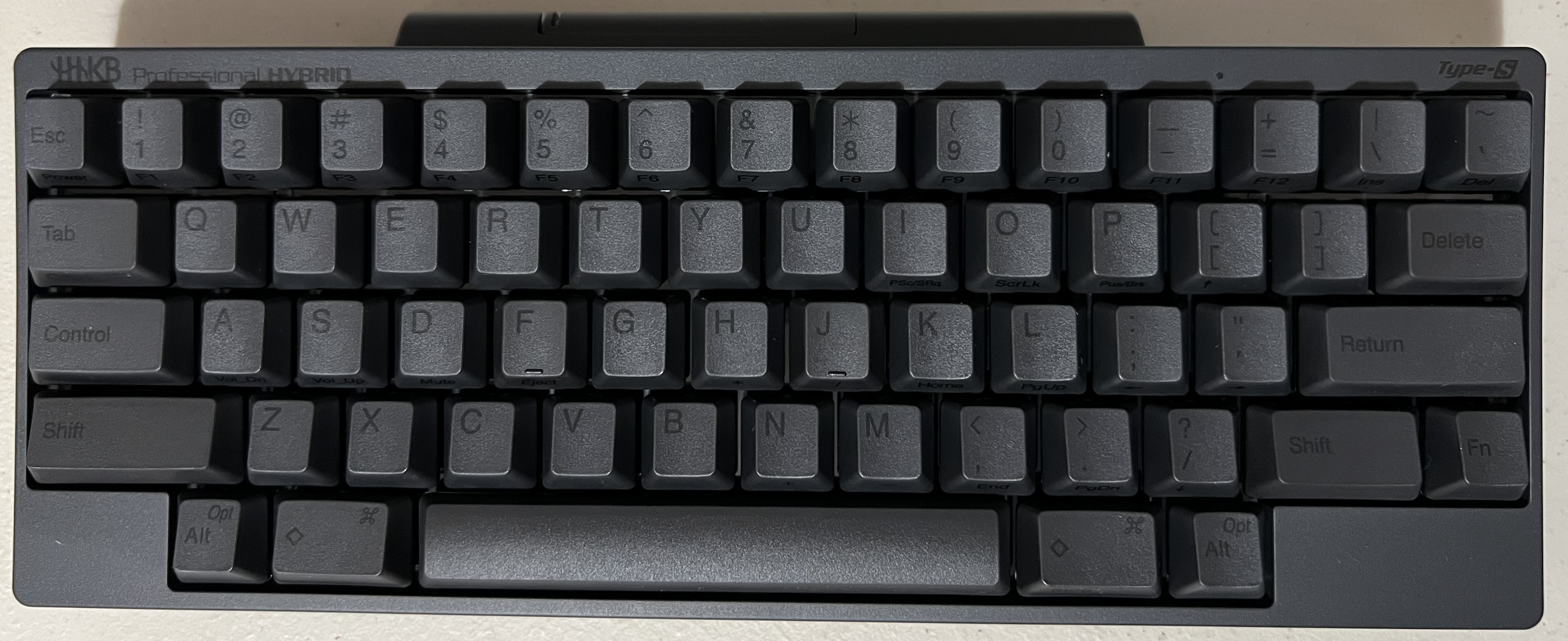
HHKB Pro Hybrid Type-S

The third-generation models of HHKB Professional: Classic, Hybrid, and Hybrid Type-S – were released in December 2019. These third-generation models feature 100% PBT keycaps, where previous models used ABS for the space bar. Furthermore, the third-generation models feature USB-C connectivity instead of mini-USB. HHKB Professional Hybrid models run on AA batteries housed in a "battery bump", similar to the previous HHKB Professional BT. However, unlike the HHKB Professional BT, these models can also be used with a wired connection via the USB-C port. HHKB Professional Hybrid models also support PFU's official key remapping software.

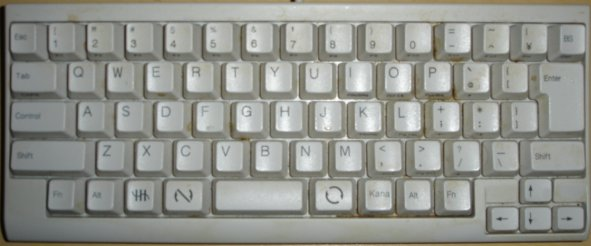
Happy Hacking Keyboard Lite 2 with 68 labeled keys

== Common features ==
Some of the Happy Hacking Keyboard design tenets, as dictated by Wada, include a minimal 60-key design, no cursor or function keys, and standard keyboard pitch, all optimized for use in Unix environments.

Happy Hacking Keyboards lack a numeric keypad, and keys outside the typewriter key area are mainly accessible through the Fn key. The keys are arranged in a layout resembling the Sun Type 3 keyboard. Specifically:

- The control key is placed where most keyboards place the caps lock. This is the only control key on the keyboard.
- The esc key is located to the left of the 1 key; the tilde key normally found there is at the right end of the same row.
- The delete key is located directly above the enter key; the key normally found there is the second-rightmost key on the row above it. Further, this is a true delete key, not a historically named backspace. Backspace is accessible via Fn+Delete though its function can be interchanged with the backspace key using a DIP switch, using this setting, the delete key is accessed via Fn+`
- The meta keys are located between the space bar and the alt keys.

On the far side of the keyboard there are DIP switches. These may be used to:

- Turn the delete key into a backspace. Fn+Delete remains backspace, and Fn+` (top-right key) remains delete.
- Swap the alt and meta keys.
- Enable/disable downstream USB ports on USB models.
- Set the OS
- Enable/disable power-saving mode on HHKB Hybrid models

It is roughly the size of A5 paper.

== Model overview ==
Model names with JP denote a Japanese layout variant.

Model name	Model #	Color	Switch type	Interface	Blank keycaps	Introduced	EOL	Notes
Happy Hacking Keyboard	PD-KB02	White	Membrane	PS/2, Sun, ADB	No	Dec 20, 1996	Dec 10, 2006	Buzzer (Sun), Power supply switch (Sun/Mac)
Happy Hacking Keyboard	PD-KB02N	White	Membrane	PS/2, Sun, ADB	No	Dec 20, 1996	Dec 10, 2006	Buzzer (Sun), Power supply switch (Sun/Mac)
Happy Hacking Keyboard Lite	PD-KB100W	White	Membrane	PS/2	No	Jun 7, 1999	Unknown	Was also available in black and white unlabeled versions
Happy Hacking Keyboard Lite 2	PD-KB200W/P	White	Membrane	PS/2	No	Mar 15, 2001	Dec 19, 2008	Arrow keys, 2-port USB hub. Available in Japanese and English layouts.
Happy Hacking Keyboard Lite 2	PD-KB200B/P	Black	Membrane	PS/2	No	Mar 15, 2001	Dec 19, 2008	Arrow keys, 2-port USB hub. Available in Japanese and English layouts.
Happy Hacking Keyboard Lite 2	PD-KB200W/U	White	Membrane	USB	No	Mar 15, 2001		Arrow keys, 2-port USB hub. Available in Japanese and English layouts.
Happy Hacking Keyboard Lite 2	PD-KB200B/U	Black	Membrane	USB	No	Mar 15, 2001		Arrow keys, 2-port USB hub. Available in Japanese and English layouts.
Happy Hacking Keyboard Lite 2	PD-KB210W/U	White	Membrane	USB	No	Mar 15, 2001		Arrow keys, 2-port USB hub. Available in Japanese and English layouts.
Happy Hacking Keyboard Lite 2	PD-KB210B/U	Black	Membrane	USB	No	Mar 15, 2001		Arrow keys, 2-port USB hub. Available in Japanese and English layouts.
Happy Hacking Keyboard Lite 2	PD-KB220W/U	White	Membrane	USB	No	Mar 15, 2001		Arrow keys, 2-port USB hub. Available in Japanese and English layouts.
Happy Hacking Keyboard Lite 2	PD-KB220B/U	Black	Membrane	USB	No	Mar 15, 2001		Arrow keys, 2-port USB hub. Available in Japanese and English layouts.
Happy Hacking Keyboard Lite 2	PD-KB220MKW	White	Membrane	USB	No	Mar 15, 2001		Mac version, has command and option keys in addition to the other Lite 2 features.
Happy Hacking Keyboard Lite 2	PD-KB200MKB	Black	Membrane	USB	No	Mar 15, 2001		Mac version, has command and option keys in addition to the other Lite 2 features.
Happy Hacking Keyboard Lite 2	PD-KB200MA	White	Membrane	USB	No	Mar 15, 2001		Mac version, has command and option keys in addition to the other Lite 2 features.
Happy Hacking Keyboard Lite 2	PD-KB220MA	White	Membrane	USB	No	Mar 15, 2001		Mac version, has command and option keys in addition to the other Lite 2 features.
Happy Hacking Keyboard Professional	PD-KB300	White	Topre capacitive	USB	No	Apr 24, 2003	Dec 10, 2006	First HHKB to use Topre keyswitches
Happy Hacking Keyboard Professional	PD-KB300B	Charcoal	Topre capacitive	USB	No	Apr 24, 2003	Dec 10, 2006	First HHKB to use Topre keyswitches
Happy Hacking Keyboard Professional	PD-KB300NL	White	Topre capacitive	USB	Yes	Apr 24, 2003	Dec 10, 2006	First HHKB to use Topre keyswitches
Happy Hacking Keyboard Professional	PD-KB300BN	Charcoal	Topre capacitive	USB	Yes	Apr 24, 2003	Dec 10, 2006	First HHKB to use Topre keyswitches
Happy Hacking Keyboard Professional 2	PD-KB400W	White	Topre capacitive	USB	No	Mar 24, 2006	Dec 10, 2019	
Happy Hacking Keyboard Professional 2	PD-KB400B	Charcoal	Topre capacitive	USB	No	Mar 24, 2006	Dec 10, 2019	
Happy Hacking Keyboard Professional 2	PD-KB400WN	White	Topre capacitive	USB	Yes	Mar 24, 2006	Dec 10, 2019	
Happy Hacking Keyboard Professional 2	PD-KB400BN	Charcoal	Topre capacitive	USB	Yes	Mar 24, 2006	Dec 10, 2019	
Happy Hacking Keyboard Professional 2 JP	PD-KB420W	White	Topre capacitive	USB	No	Nov 10, 2008	Dec 10, 2019	
Happy Hacking Keyboard Professional 2 JP	PD-KB420B	Charcoal	Topre capacitive	USB	No	Nov 10, 2008	Dec 10, 2019	
Happy Hacking Keyboard Professional HG	PD-KB500W	White	Topre capacitive	USB	No	Oct 12, 2006	Dec 10, 2019	Special 10-year anniversary models
Happy Hacking Keyboard Professional HG	PD-KB500B	Black	Topre capacitive	USB	No	Oct 12, 2006	Dec 10, 2019	Special 10-year anniversary models
Happy Hacking Keyboard Professional HG	PD-KB500WN	White	Topre capacitive	USB	Yes	Oct 12, 2006	Dec 10, 2019	Special 10-year anniversary models
Happy Hacking Keyboard Professional HG	PD-KB500BN	Black	Topre capacitive	USB	Yes	Oct 12, 2006	Dec 10, 2019	Special 10-year anniversary models
Happy Hacking Keyboard Professional HG JAPAN	PD-KB500J	Wajima-style lacquer	Topre capacitive	USB	Yes	Oct 12, 2006	Dec 10, 2019	Special 10-year anniversary models
Happy Hacking Keyboard Professional 2 Type-S	PD-KB400WS	White	Topre capacitive	USB	No	Jun 29, 2011	Dec 10, 2019	Silenced variant
Happy Hacking Keyboard Professional 2 Type-S	PD-KB400WNS	White	Topre capacitive	USB	Yes	Jun 29, 2011	Dec 10, 2019	Silenced variant
Happy Hacking Keyboard Professional 2 Type-S JP	PD-KB420WS	White	Topre capacitive	USB	No	Jun 29, 2011	Dec 10, 2019	Silenced variant
Happy Hacking Keyboard Professional BT	PD-KB600B	Charcoal	Topre capacitive	Bluetooth	No	Apr 12, 2016	Dec 10, 2019	First HHKB to use Bluetooth
Happy Hacking Keyboard Professional BT	PD-KB600BN	Charcoal	Topre capacitive	Bluetooth	Yes	Apr 12, 2016	Dec 10, 2019	First HHKB to use Bluetooth
Happy Hacking Keyboard Professional BT	PD-KB600W	White	Topre capacitive	Bluetooth	No	Apr 12, 2016	Dec 10, 2019	First HHKB to use Bluetooth
Happy Hacking Keyboard Professional BT	PD-KB600WN	White	Topre capacitive	Bluetooth	Yes	Apr 12, 2016	Dec 10, 2019	First HHKB to use Bluetooth
Happy Hacking Keyboard Professional BT JP	PD-KB620B	Charcoal	Topre capacitive	Bluetooth	No	Apr 12, 2016	Dec 10, 2019	First HHKB to use Bluetooth
Happy Hacking Keyboard Professional BT JP	PD-KB620W	White	Topre capacitive	Bluetooth	No	Apr 12, 2016	Dec 10, 2019	First HHKB to use Bluetooth
Happy Hacking Keyboard Professional Classic	PD-KB401W	White	Topre capacitive	USB-C	No	Dec 10, 2019		
Happy Hacking Keyboard Professional Classic	PD-KB401WN	White	Topre capacitive	USB-C	Yes	Dec 10, 2019		
Happy Hacking Keyboard Professional Classic	PD-KB401B	Charcoal	Topre capacitive	USB-C	No	Dec 10, 2019		
Happy Hacking Keyboard Professional Classic	PD-KB401BN	Charcoal	Topre capacitive	USB-C	Yes	Dec 10, 2019		
Happy Hacking Keyboard Professional Hybrid	PD-KB800W	White	Topre capacitive	Dual mode USB-C or Bluetooth	No	Dec 10, 2019		
Happy Hacking Keyboard Professional Hybrid	PD-KB800WN	White	Topre capacitive	Dual mode USB-C or Bluetooth	Yes	Dec 10, 2019		
Happy Hacking Keyboard Professional Hybrid	PD-KB800B	Charcoal	Topre capacitive	Dual mode USB-C or Bluetooth	No	Dec 10, 2019		
Happy Hacking Keyboard Professional Hybrid	PD-KB800BN	Charcoal	Topre capacitive	Dual mode USB-C or Bluetooth	Yes	Dec 10, 2019		
Happy Hacking Keyboard Professional Hybrid JP	PD-KB820W	White	Topre capacitive	Dual mode USB-C or Bluetooth	No	Dec 10, 2019		
Happy Hacking Keyboard Professional Hybrid JP	PD-KB820B	Charcoal	Topre capacitive	Dual mode USB-C or Bluetooth	No	Dec 10, 2019		
Happy Hacking Keyboard Professional Hybrid Type-S	PD-KB800WS	White	Topre capacitive	Dual mode USB-C or Bluetooth	No	Dec 10, 2019		Silenced variant
Happy Hacking Keyboard Professional Hybrid Type-S	PD-KB800WNS	White	Topre capacitive	Dual mode USB-C or Bluetooth	Yes	Dec 10, 2019		Silenced variant
Happy Hacking Keyboard Professional Hybrid Type-S	PD-KB800BS	Charcoal	Topre capacitive	Dual mode USB-C or Bluetooth	No	Dec 10, 2019		Silenced variant
Happy Hacking Keyboard Professional Hybrid Type-S	PD-KB800BNS	Charcoal	Topre capacitive	Dual mode USB-C or Bluetooth	Yes	Dec 10, 2019		Silenced variant
Happy Hacking Keyboard Professional Hybrid Type-S JP	PD-KB820WS	White	Topre capacitive	Dual mode USB-C or Bluetooth	No	Dec 10, 2019		Silenced variant
Happy Hacking Keyboard Professional Hybrid Type-S JP	PD-KB820BS	Charcoal	Topre capacitive	Dual mode USB-C or Bluetooth	No	Dec 10, 2019		Silenced variant
Happy Hacking Keyboard Professional Classic Type-S	PD-KB401WSC	White	Topre capacitive	USB	No	Oct 21, 2025		Silenced variant
Happy Hacking Keyboard Professional Classic Type-S	PD-KB401BSC	Charcoal	Topre capacitive	USB	No	Oct 21, 2025		Silenced variant
Happy Hacking Keyboard Professional Classic Type-S	PD-KB401YSC	Snow	Topre capacitive	USB	No	Oct 21, 2025		Silenced variant

== See also ==
- List of mechanical keyboards
- Das Keyboard
- FrogPad
- Optimus Maximus keyboard
- Model M keyboard
- Space-cadet keyboard
