= List of keyboard switches =

== Commonly used mechanical switches on pre-built keyboards ==
Manufacturers frequently build computer keyboards using switches from original equipment manufacturers (OEMs). The switches used determine the feel of the keyboard.

Brand	OEM	Switch name	Cherry MX equivalent	Switch Type	Actuation force	Tactile force	Actuation point	Total travel	Product code	Durability (actuations)
Cherry	Cherry	Black	Cherry MX Black	Linear	0.60 N	N/A	2.0 mm	4.0 mm	MX1A-11xx	>100 million
Cherry	Cherry	Red	Cherry MX Red	Linear	0.45 N	N/A	2.0 mm	4.0 mm	MX1A-L1xx	>100 million
Cherry	Cherry	Brown	Cherry MX Brown	Tactile	0.45 N	0.55 N	2.0 mm	4.0 mm	MX1A-G1xx	>100 million
Cherry	Cherry	Blue	Cherry MX Blue	Clicky	0.50 N	0.60 N	2.2 mm	4.0 mm	MX1A-E1xx	>50 million
Cherry	Cherry	Green	Cherry MX Green	Clicky	0.70 N	0.80 N	2.2 mm	4.0 mm	MX1A-F1xx	>50 million
Cherry	Cherry	Clear	Cherry MX Clear	Tactile	0.55 N	0.65 N	2.0 mm	4.0 mm	MX1A-C1xx	
Cherry	Cherry	Grey (Tactile)	Cherry MX Tactile Grey	Tactile	0.80 N	0.80 N	2.0 mm	4.0 mm	MX1A-D1xx	>50 million
Cherry	Cherry	Grey (Linear) (formerly Dark grey)	Cherry MX Linear Grey	Linear	0.80 N	N/A	2.0 mm	4.0 mm	MX1A-21xx	
Cherry	Cherry	Nature White	Cherry MX Nature White	Linear	0.55 N	N/A	2.0 mm	4.0 mm	MX1A-41NA	
Cherry	Cherry	Speed Silver	Cherry MX Speed Silver	Linear	0.45 N	N/A	1.2 mm	3.4 mm	MX1A-51xx	
Cherry	Cherry	Low Profile Red	Cherry MX Low Profile Red	Linear	0.45 ± 0.15 N	N/A	1.2 ± 0.3 mm	3.2 ± 0.25 mm	MX1B-L2NA	>50 million
Cherry	Cherry	Low Profile Speed	Cherry MX Low Profile Speed	Linear	0.45 ± 0.15 N	N/A	1.0 ± 0.3 mm	3.2 ± 0.25 mm	MX1B-52NA	>50 million
Cherry	Cherry	Silent Black	Cherry MX Silent Black	Linear	0.60 N	N/A	1.9 mm	3.7 mm	MX3A-11xx	
Cherry	Cherry	Silent Red	Cherry MX Silent Red	Linear	0.45 N	N/A	1.9 mm	3.7 mm	MX3A-L1xx	
Cherry	Cherry	Purple	Cherry MX Purple	Tactile	0.35 N	0.55 N	2.0 mm	4.0 mm	MX2A-V1NW	
Kailh	Kailh	Black	Cherry MX Black	Linear	0.60 N	N/A	1.9 mm			
Kailh	Kailh	Red	Cherry MX Red	Linear	0.50 N	N/A	1.9 mm			
Kailh	Kailh	Blue	Cherry MX Blue	Clicky	0.50 N	0.60 N	1.9 mm			
Kailh	Kailh	Brown	Cherry MX Brown	Tactile	0.50 N	N/A	1.9 mm			
Kailh	Kailh	Speed Silver	Cherry MX Speed Silver	Linear	0.50 N	N/A	1.3 mm			
Kailh	Kailh	Speed Bronze	N/A	Clicky	0.50 N	N/A	1.3 mm			
Kailh	Kailh	Speed Copper	N/A	Tactile	0.50 N	N/A	1.3 mm			
Razer	Kailh	Green	Cherry MX Blue	Clicky	0.50 N		1.9 ± 0.4 mm			80 million
Razer	Greetech	Green	Cherry MX Blue	Clicky						
Razer	Kailh	Orange	Cherry MX Brown	Tactile	0.45 cN		1.9 ± 0.4 mm			80 million
Razer	Greetech	Orange	Cherry MX Brown	Tactile						
Razer	Kailh	Yellow	Cherry MX Speed Silver	Linear	0.45 N	N/A	1.2 ± 0.3 mm	3.5 mm		
Razer	Greetech	Yellow	Cherry MX Speed Silver	Linear		N/A				
Razer	DMET	Red (Optical Switch)	Cherry MX Red	Linear	0.40 N	N/A	1.0 mm			100 million
Razer	DMET	Purple (Optical Switch)	Cherry MX Blue	Clicky	0.45 N	N/A	1.5 mm			100 million
Logitech	Kailh	GL Linear	Cherry MX Low Profile Red	Linear	0.50 N	N/A	1.5 mm	2.7 mm		80 million
Logitech	Kailh	GL Tactile	N/A	Tactile	0.50 N	0.60 N	1.5 mm	2.7 mm		80 million
Logitech	Kailh	GL Clicky	N/A	Clicky	0.50 N	0.60 N	1.5 mm	2.7 mm		80 million
Logitech	Omron	Romer-G Linear	N/A	Linear	0.45 N	N/A	1.5 mm	3.2 mm		70 million
Logitech	Omron	Romer-G Tactile	N/A	Tactile	0.45 N	0.50 N	1.5 mm	3.2 mm		70 million
Logitech	Kailh	GX Red	Cherry MX Red	Linear	0.50 N	N/A	1.9 mm	4.0 mm		
Logitech	Kailh	GX Blue	Cherry MX Blue	Clicky	0.50 N	0.60 N	2.0 mm	4.0 mm		70 million
Logitech	Kailh	GX Brown	Cherry MX Brown	Tactile	0.50 N	0.60 N	1.9 mm	4.0 mm		70 million
Roccat	Roccat	Roccat Titan Linear	Cherry MX Red	Linear		N/A	1.4 mm	3.6 mm		
Roccat	Roccat	Roccat Titan Tactile	Cherry MX Brown	Tactile			1.8 mm	3.6 mm		
Outemu	Gaote/Outemu	Reds	Cherry MX Reds	Linear	0.50 N	N/A	1.5 mm	4.0 mm		50 million
Outemu	Gaote/Outemu	Browns	Cherry MX Browns	Tactile	0.50 N	0.55 N	2.0 mm	4.0 mm		50 million
Outemu	Gaote/Outemu	Blues	Cherry MX Blues	Clicky	0.60 N	0.65 N	2.0 mm	4.0 mm		50 million
Outemu	Gaote/Outemu	Black	Cherry MX Blacks	Linear	0.70 N	N/A	2.4 mm	4.0 mm		50 million
Gateron	Gateron	Reds	Cherry MX Reds	Linear	0.45 N	N/A	2.0 mm	4.0 mm		50 million
Gateron	Gateron	Browns	Cherry MX Browns	Tactile	0.55 N	0.60 N	2.0 mm	4.0 mm		50 million
Gateron	Gateron	Blacks	Cherry MX Blacks	Linear	0.65 N	N/A	2.0 mm	4.0 mm		50 million
Gateron	Gateron	White	-	Linear	0.35 N	N/A	2.0 mm	4.0 mm		50 million
Gateron	Gateron	Green	-	Clicky	0.80 N	0.80 N	2.3 mm	4.0 mm		50 million
Gateron	Gateron	Blues	Cherry MX Blues	Clicky	0.60 N	0.65 N	2.3 mm	4.0 mm		50 million
Gateron	Gateron	Yellows	-	Linear	0.50 N	N/A	2.0 mm	4.0 mm		50 million
I.B.M./Unicomp	I.B.M./Unicomp	Buckling Spring	N/A	Clicky						>25 million (Model M) >100 million (Model F)

== Mechanical keyboard switches for custom keyboards ==
On the custom mechanical keyboard space, there are far greater quantity of keyboard switches. That these do not portray the diversity and number of switches currently on the market.

Brand	OEM	Switch name	Stem design	Switch type	Click type	Initial force	Actuation force	Spring force	Actuation point	Total travel	Mounting type	Factory lube	SMD LED compatibility	Key stroke lifespan
Drop x Invyr	Kailh	Holy Panda	MX Type stem	Tactile	N/A	67 g	67 g	67 g	1.2 mm	4.0 mm	Plate mounting	No	Yes	80 million
Drop	Kailh	Halo True	MX Type stem	Tactile	N/A	60 g	54 g	100 g	1.9 mm	4.0 mm	Plate mounting	Yes	Yes	80 million
Drop	Kailh	Halo Clear	MX Type stem	Tactile	N/A	65 g	52 g	78 g	1.9 mm	4.0 mm	Plate mounting	Yes	Yes	80 million
Kailh	Kailh	Box White	MX Type stem	Clicky	Click Bar	50 g	50 g	60 g	1.8 mm	4.0 mm	Plate mounting	No	Yes	80 million
Kailh	Kailh	BOX Glazed Green	MX Type stem	Clicky	Click Bar	50 g	50 g	50 g	1.8 mm	3.6 mm	Plate Mounting	No	Yes	80 million
Kailh	Kailh	BOX Jade	MX Type stem	Clicky	Click Bar	50 g	50 g	60 g	1.8 mm	3.6 mm	Plate Mounting	No	Yes	80 million
Kailh	Kailh	BOX Pale Blue	MX Type stem	Clicky	Click Bar	60 g	60 g	80 g	1.8 mm	3.6 mm	Plate Mounting	No	Yes	80 million
Kailh	Kailh	BOX Navy	MX Type stem	Clicky	Click Bar	60 g	60 g	90 g	1.8 mm	3.6 mm	Plate Mounting	No	Yes	80 million
Kailh	Kailh	BOX Noble Yellow	MX Type stem	Clicky	Click Bar	65 g	65 g	65 g	1.8 mm	3.6 mm	Plate Mounting	No	Yes	80 million
Kailh	Kailh	BOX Pinks	MX Type stem	Clicky	Click Bar	65 g	65 g	65 g	1.8 mm	3.6 mm	Plate Mounting	No	Yes	80 million
Gateron	Gateron	Aliaz Silent	MX Type Stem	Silent Tactile	N/A	N/A	N/A	60/70/ 80/100g	2.0 mm	4.0 mm	Plate Mounting	No	Yes	N/A
Zeal PC	Gateron	Clickiez	MX Type Stem	Clicky/Tactile/Linear	Click Leaf	40/75 g	32/58 g	73/95 g	2.0 mm (unchecked)	4.0 mm	Plate Mounting	No	Yes	N/A
Zeal PC	Gateron	Crystal	MX Type Stem	Tactile	N/A	~50g	~70g	60 g	2.0 mm	4.0 mm	Plate Mounting	No	Yes	N/A
Zeal PC	Gateron	Zealio V1 Redux	MX Type Stem	Tactile	N/A	?	?	62g/67g	2.0 mm	4.0 mm	Plate Mounting	No	Yes	N/A

== Future ==
On top of a variety of new switches being made, consumers are taking parts of different switches and then going on to make their own switches, called “Franken-switches.”
