= Keycap =

Cover placed over a computer keyboard key

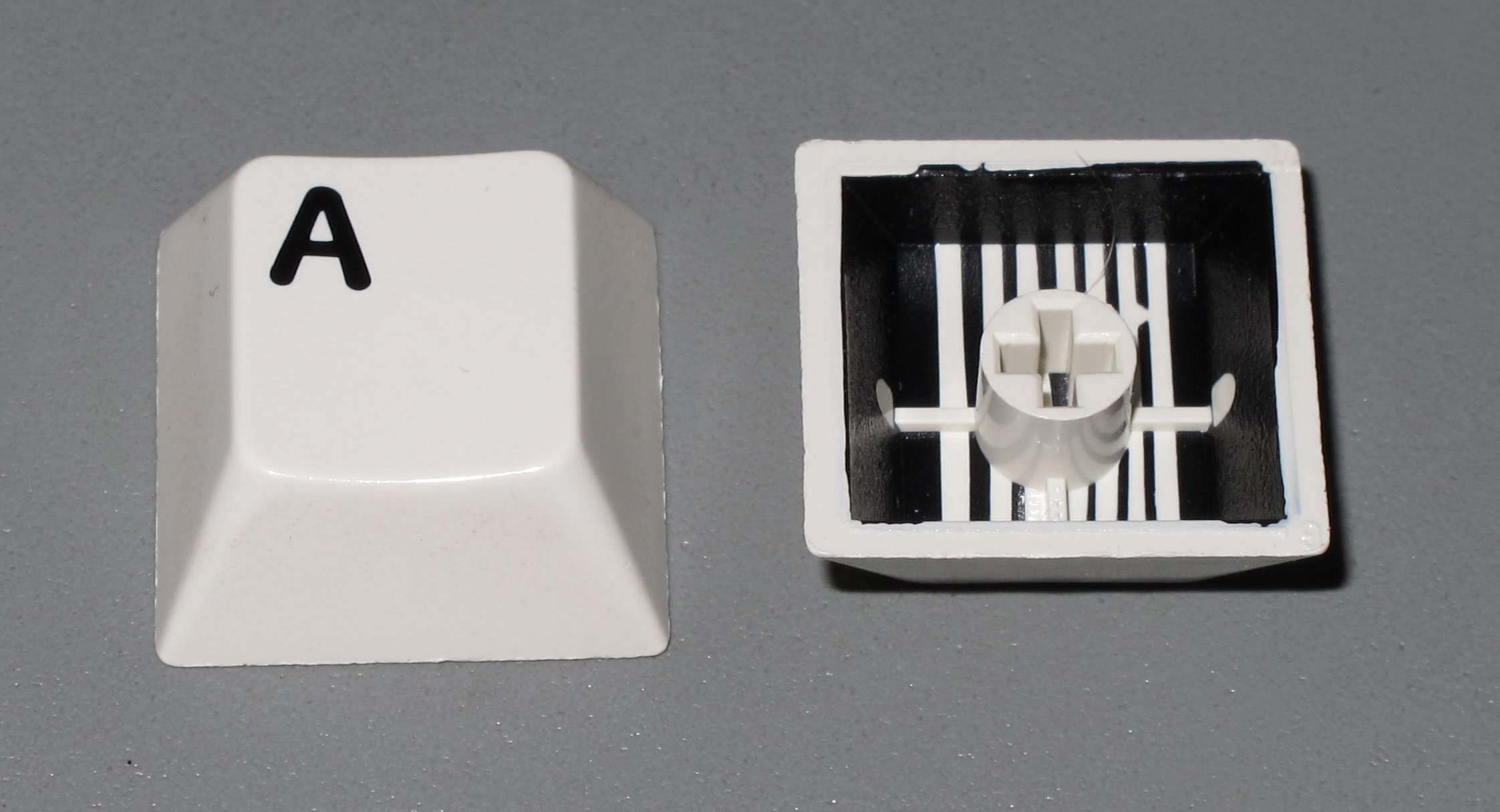
Two-shot injection molded keycaps

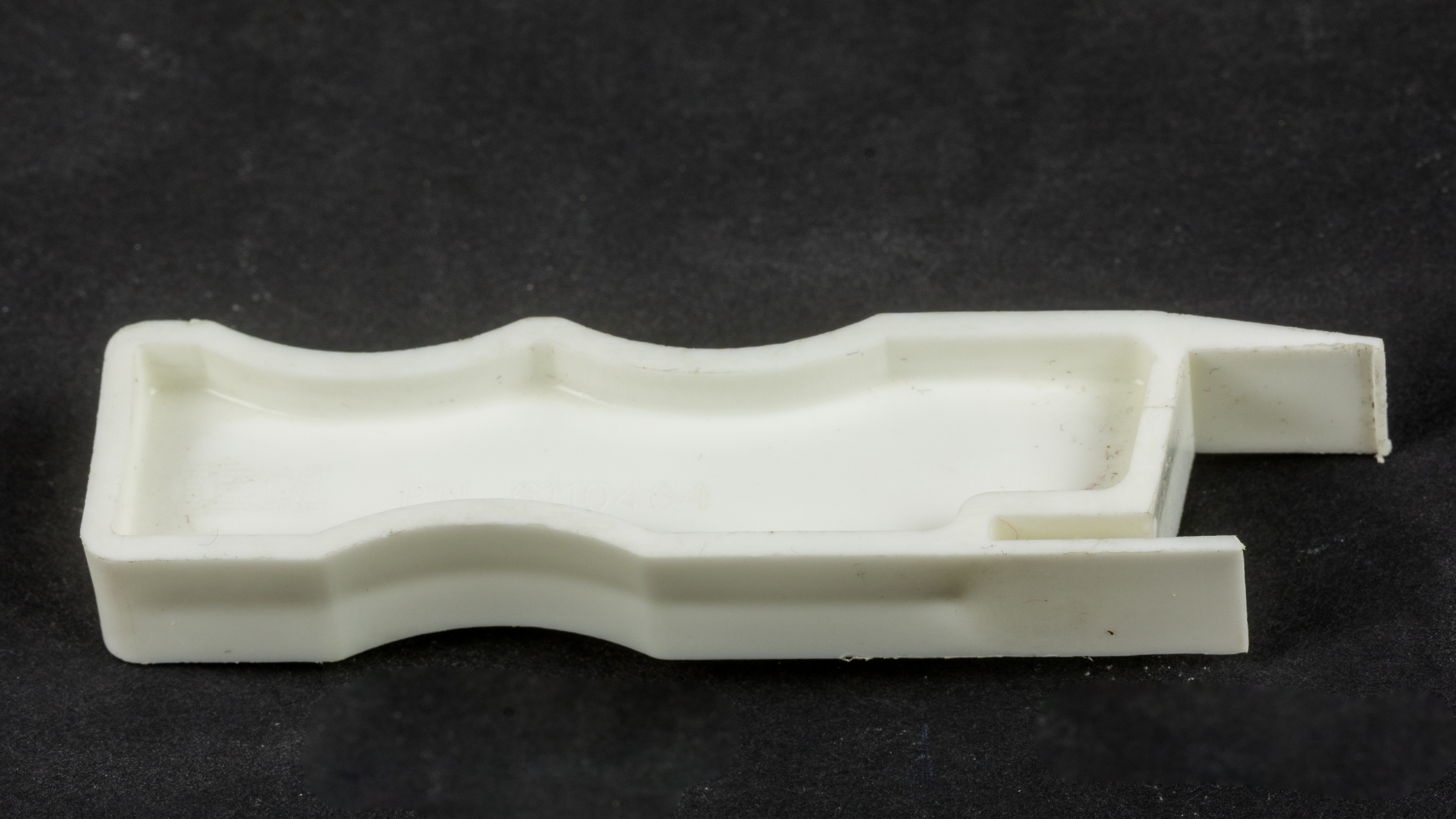
Keycap removal tool

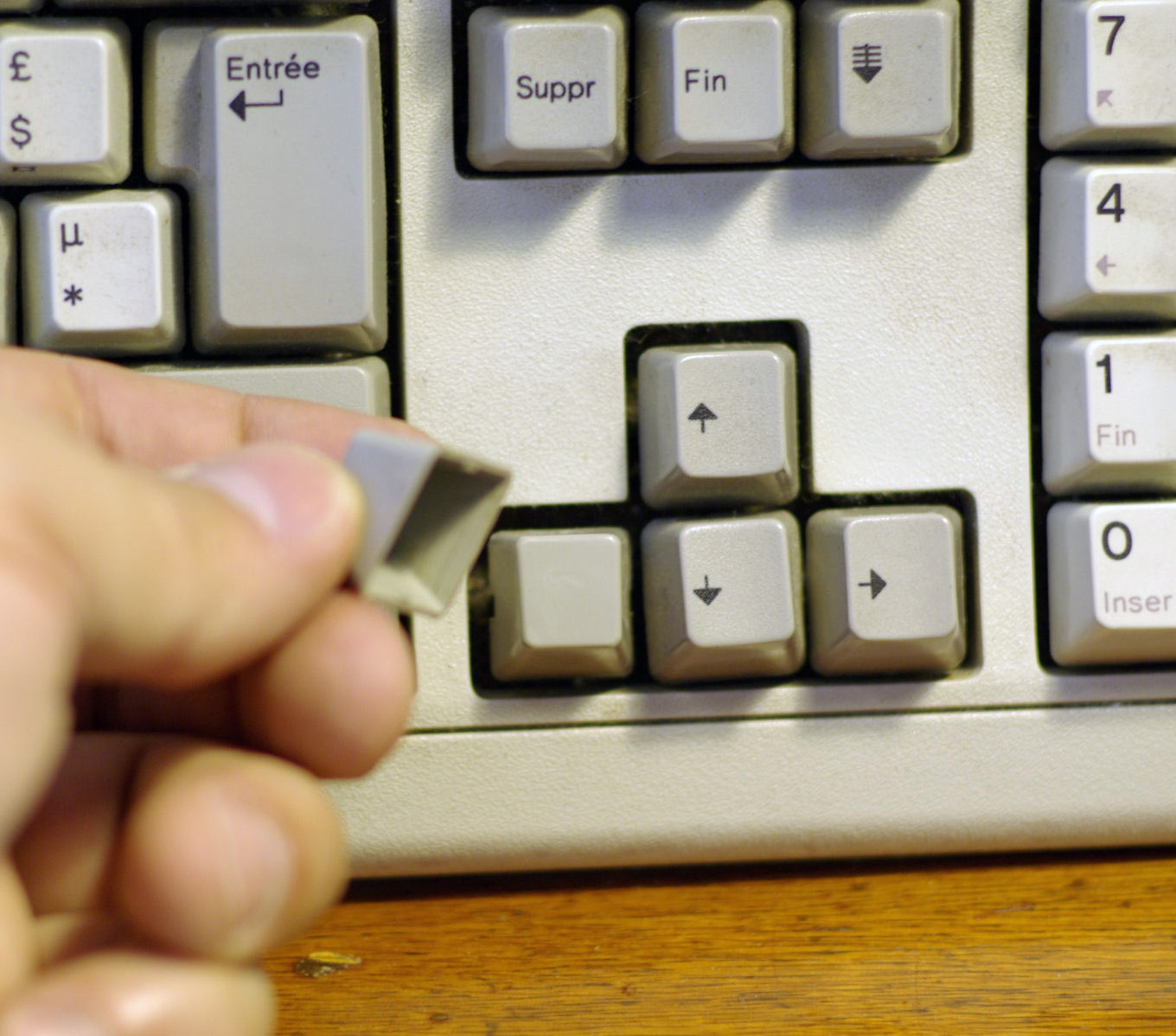
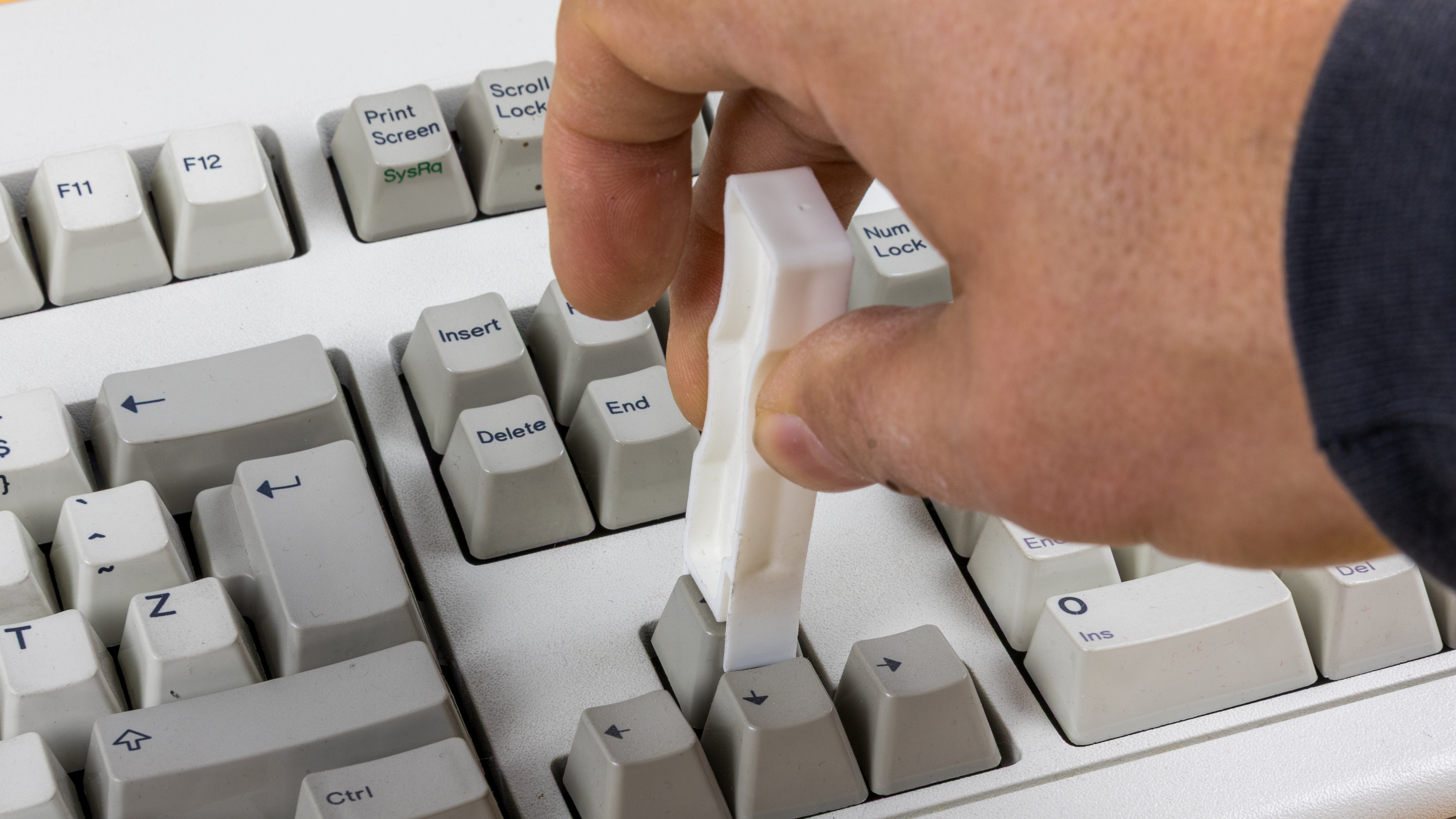
Swappable keycaps of a French Model M keyboard, removing a keycap with the tool

A keycap is a small cover of plastic, metal, or other material placed over the keyswitch of a computer keyboard. Keycaps are often illustrated to indicate the key function or alphanumeric character they correspond to. Early keyboards were manufactured with the keyswitch and keycap integrated in one unit; keycaps separate from the switch were introduced to facilitate the production of different keyboard layouts.

== History ==
Typical keycaps in the 1970s and 1980s were produced using two-shot molding, with the markings molded into each keycap in a different color of plastic. This eventually fell out of favor, as it was more expensive (particularly in tooling costs), and tended to produce keycaps more durable than the equipment on which they were mounted. Modern keycaps are usually labelled by stamping or laser engraving. However, two-shot molding ("doubleshot") keycaps are still available today, known for their feel and general durability.

== Modern keycaps ==
Keycaps can be bought in replacement sets for a keyboard. Notably, replacement sets are frequently sold for keyboards that use Cherry MX-style stems. Custom sets are bought and sold within the enthusiast communities, and artisan keycaps can be purchased individually. Artisan keycaps are unique or produced in small batches, and can feature intricate designs; they are often made with malleable materials like resin or silicone.

Keycaps are sold in printed and unprinted varieties. The unprinted or blank variety is said to promote touch typing and help build muscle memory because the user is forced to rely on motion rather than visuals. However, within the modern mechanical keyboard community, unprinted caps are typically chosen for their visual appeal. There are many designs a user may choose: from anime, bi-color and video game-based to custom-made keycaps.

The most common plastics used are acrylonitrile butadiene styrene (ABS), polybutylene terephthalate (PBT) and polyoxymethylene (POM) (see the materials section). The top of most keycaps may be described as cylinder-shaped (curving to the sides as if a fat cylinder was resting on it), flat or spherical (curving to the top, bottom and sides as if a large sphere was resting on it). The modern preference is for cylinder-shaped keycaps rather than spherical ones, but laptop keys are often flat.

== Construction ==
=== Materials ===
Keycaps materials vary among the brands and provide different feels, durability, damage resistance, and other properties.

Material	Description
Acrylonitrile butadiene styrene (ABS)	This is commonly used for keyboard casings and keys. It is a comparatively soft material compared to some modern plastics but is tough and resistant to breakage. Topre casings are made of ABS, and IBM Model Ms are as well. Filco and Das keys are made of ABS, as are most keys that ship with computer keyboards. It has a bit of a "slick" feeling. For example, Lego is made of ABS.
Polybutylene terephthalate (PBT)	PBT is a harder long-wearing material with a "sandier" feel and should not yellow as much as ABS over time. The downside is the brittle nature of PBT and expense, so most keyboard manufacturers do not use this for either keyboard cases or keys. Exceptions are some Cherry/Poker/Leopold keys and IBM/Unicomp keys.
Polyoxymethylene (POM)	Better known by the brand name "Delrin", it is an abrasion-resistant, solvent-resistant and low-friction material. However, it is expensive and not common. Found use in older black Cherry G80 keycaps and the discontinued Nopoo Chocolate keyboards. Keycool used to use it with their keyboards but is now phasing it out. Currently, Vortex is using POM as the lettering infill on their Backlit Doubleshot PBT/POM Keys. Cherry MX key casings are made of POM Chemical Testing, as are the stems Cherry Labeling on MY steB.
Polycarbonate (PC)	Soft clear plastic. Used for translucent keys like this Signature Plastic keyset.

=== Printing of characters ===
Printing of numbers, letters, and symbols on the keycaps is done using pad printing, laser etching, or dye sublimation.

Method	Description
Pad printing	This is the cheapest and most common method. It involves transferring ink from an etched plate onto the surface of the keycap using a silicone pad. It is typically UV treated to provide durability against abrasion and discoloration. With keycaps this method is typically limited to a single colour typically being white or black.
Dye sublimation	Dye sublimation has become more popular in recent years due to improvements in manufacturing processes. It involves melting a layer of ink into the surface of a keycap using heat and pressure. For keycaps, dye-sublimation is only viable with PBT plastic, as its porous surface allows the ink to penetrate. The main advantage of this method is the flexibility in design as manufacturers can print detailed, full-color graphics directly onto the keycap surface. This contrasts with double-shot injection, which requires custom and expensive tooling for each legend and is typically limited to two colors per key. As a result, many brands are adopting dye-sublimation. Historically, this method was expensive and only done by a few companies such as Topre, ZF Electronics (Cherry), and Unicomp.
Laser etching	A strong laser is used to print characters onto keycaps.
Double shot	The most expensive and durable process: each outer keycap has its legend physically moulded into it, and the legend is then created by injecting a different piece of plastic into the keycap from the inside. This means that there is no chance of the legend ever fading or getting removed, even as the keycap wears down.

=== Key profile ===
As its name suggests, the easiest way to compare key profiles is to look at them from the side. The keyboard profile refers to the profile shapes of each row of keycaps. With different profiles, keys can vary in size, shape, and thickness. When (most) modern key sets vary in profile from row to row, this is called a sculpted profile.

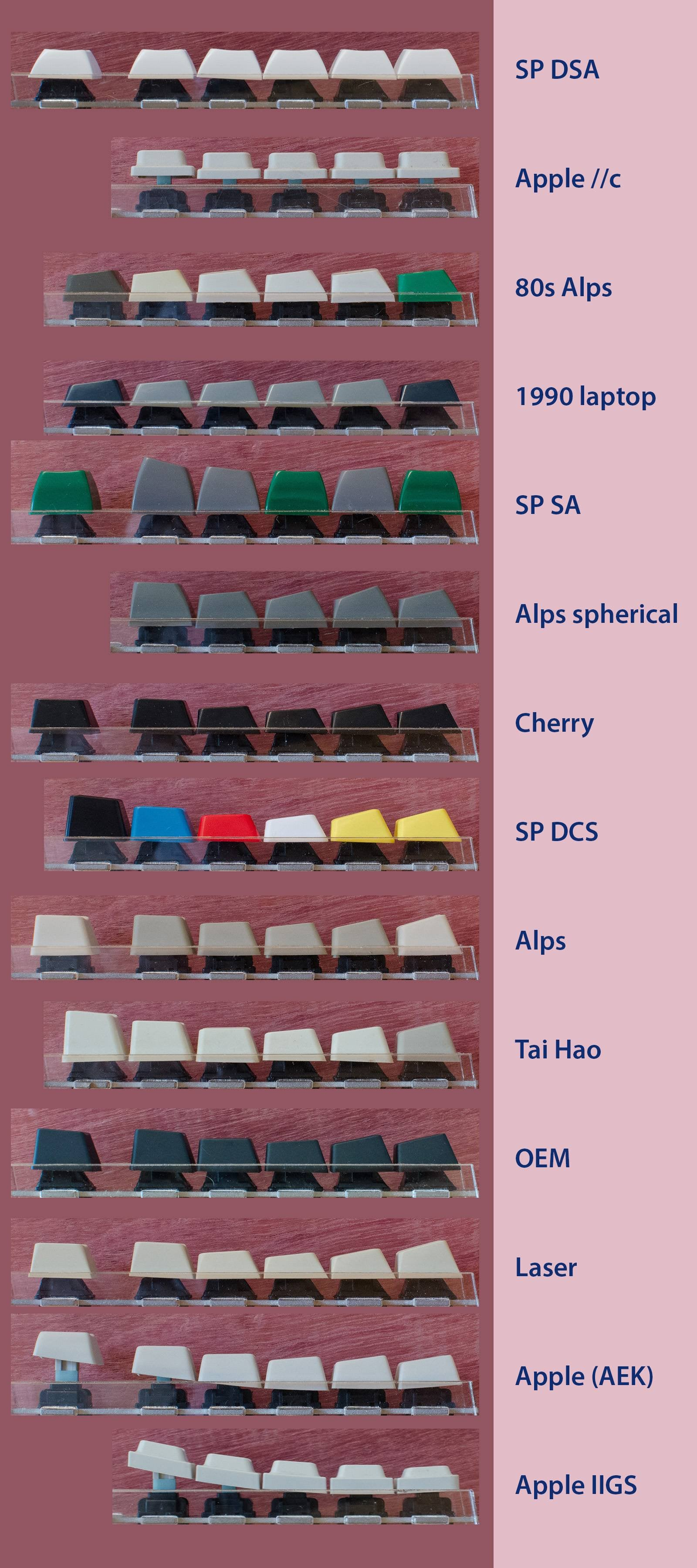
Mechanical Keyboard Profiles illustrated.

- OEM: (Original Equipment Manufacturer)
- Cherry: Developed by Cherry
- Apple
- Tai Hao
- Alps
- Laser
- DCS
- SA: (Spherical All) Developed by Signature Plastics
  - SA-P: (Spherical All, made of PBT)
  - DSA: (DIN standard, Spherical All) Developed by Signature Plastics
  - HSA: (Half Spherical All) Variant of SA
  - KAT: (Keyreative All Touch) Developed by Keyreative, variant of SA
- CSA
- OSA: (OEM SA hybrid) Developed by Keychron
- XDA
- MT3 Developed by Matt3o
- DCX Developed by Drop (discontinued)
- DCL Developed by Drop (discontinued)
