= FrogPad =

Keyboard for use with one hand

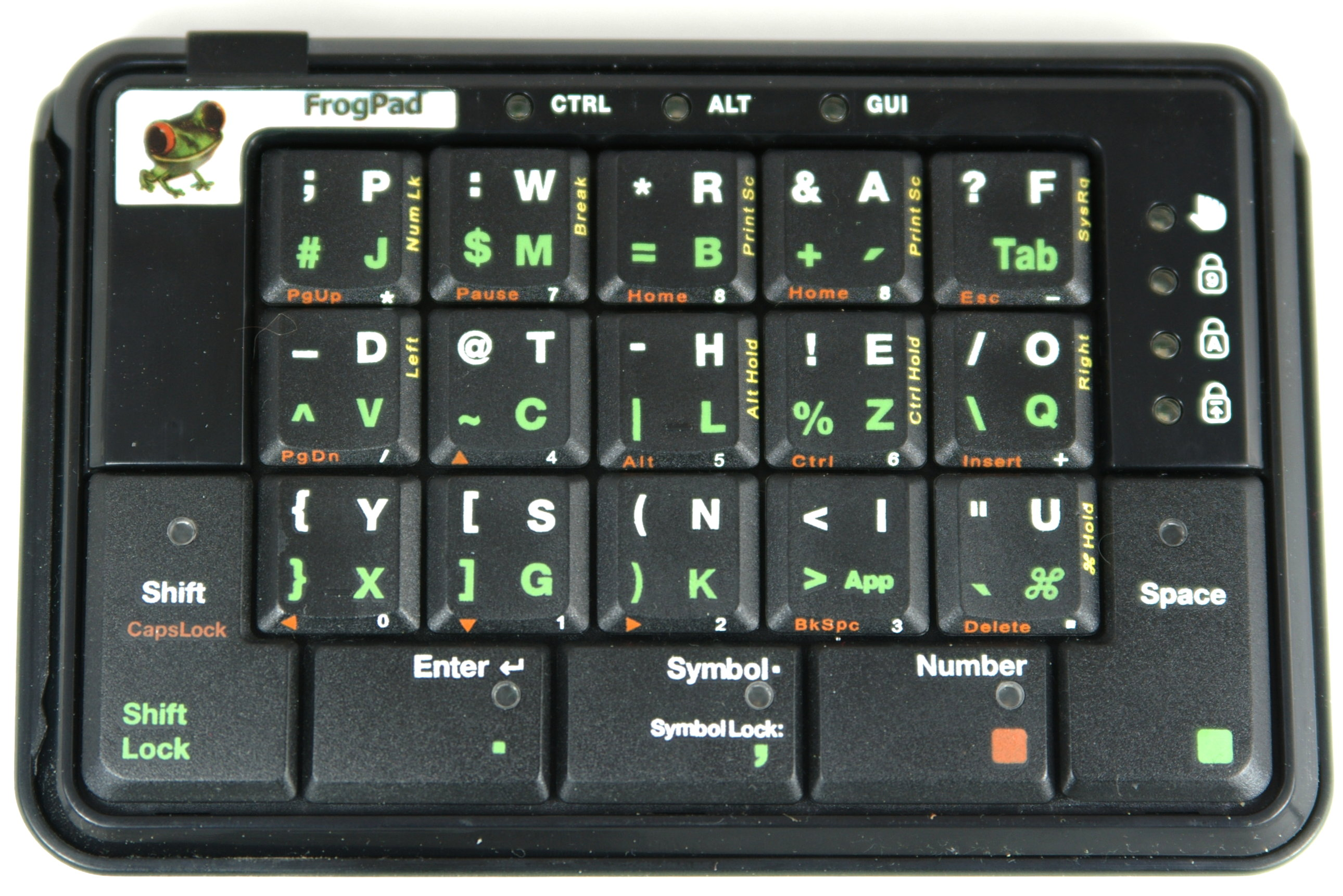
A left-handed USB FrogPad

FrogPad is a small chorded keyboard about the size of a numeric keypad that can be used with one hand. It was produced by Frogpad Inc.

The keyboard is optimized by character frequency. 85% of average keystrokes in English text can be typed without chording, and chords are limited to 2 fingers (opposable thumb and one finger). As a result, the FrogPad has many more keys than a GKOS or Microwriter or Baudot keyboard but fewer than a conventional computer keyboard.

== History ==
The founder and CEO of the company was Linda Marroquin. She left the company in 2008. The original FrogPads on the market at this time were intended to be used with mobile phones and supported only Bluetooth.

Two attempts to relaunch the Frogpad had been made. The first was made in February 2012 by Frogpad and Linda Marroquin. However, due to funding difficulties, this launch was canceled and the cost of pre-ordered units was refunded to customers in June 2012.

The second relaunch attempt was made by Andrew Taylor of IT consulting firm Satori Tech Solutions and began to advertise in November 2013 and solicit pre-orders in January 2014 for a "prototype" version to be delivered in February and a final production version in April of that year. However, neither version of the keyboards shipped, and a post on the company Facebook page from 20 May 2014 states that they "... WILL NOT ship a product I can't be proud of that lives up to what all of you expect and deserve.". Since then, the company has ceased communication.

On August 14, 2014, Frogpad founder Linda Marroquin stated that the Frogpad license to Satori Tech Solutions has expired and that she does not know why Mr. Taylor is not responding to consumers who pre-purchased products. Although she is aware of complaints filed against Mr. Taylor at the Texas AG and IC3, her stated intention is "to regain the brand after I get additional funding."
