= Topre =

Japanese engineering company

Topre Corporation
- Native name: 東プレ
- Formerly: Tokyo Press Kogyo Co. Ltd.
- Company type: Engineering, manufacturing
- Traded as: TYO: 5975
- Industry: Refrigeration, auto parts, computer peripherals
- Founded: April 1935; 91 years ago in Tokyo
- Headquarters: Tokyo, Japan
- Website: www.topre.co.jp

Topre Corporation (東プレ株式会社, Tōpure Kabushiki-gaisha) is a Japanese engineering company that manufactures stamped parts for automobiles, refrigeration units for trucks, air conditioners, and various other electronic and electro-mechanical equipment. It was founded in 1935 as Tokyo Press Kogyo Co. Ltd., in Kōtō, Tokyo.

== History ==
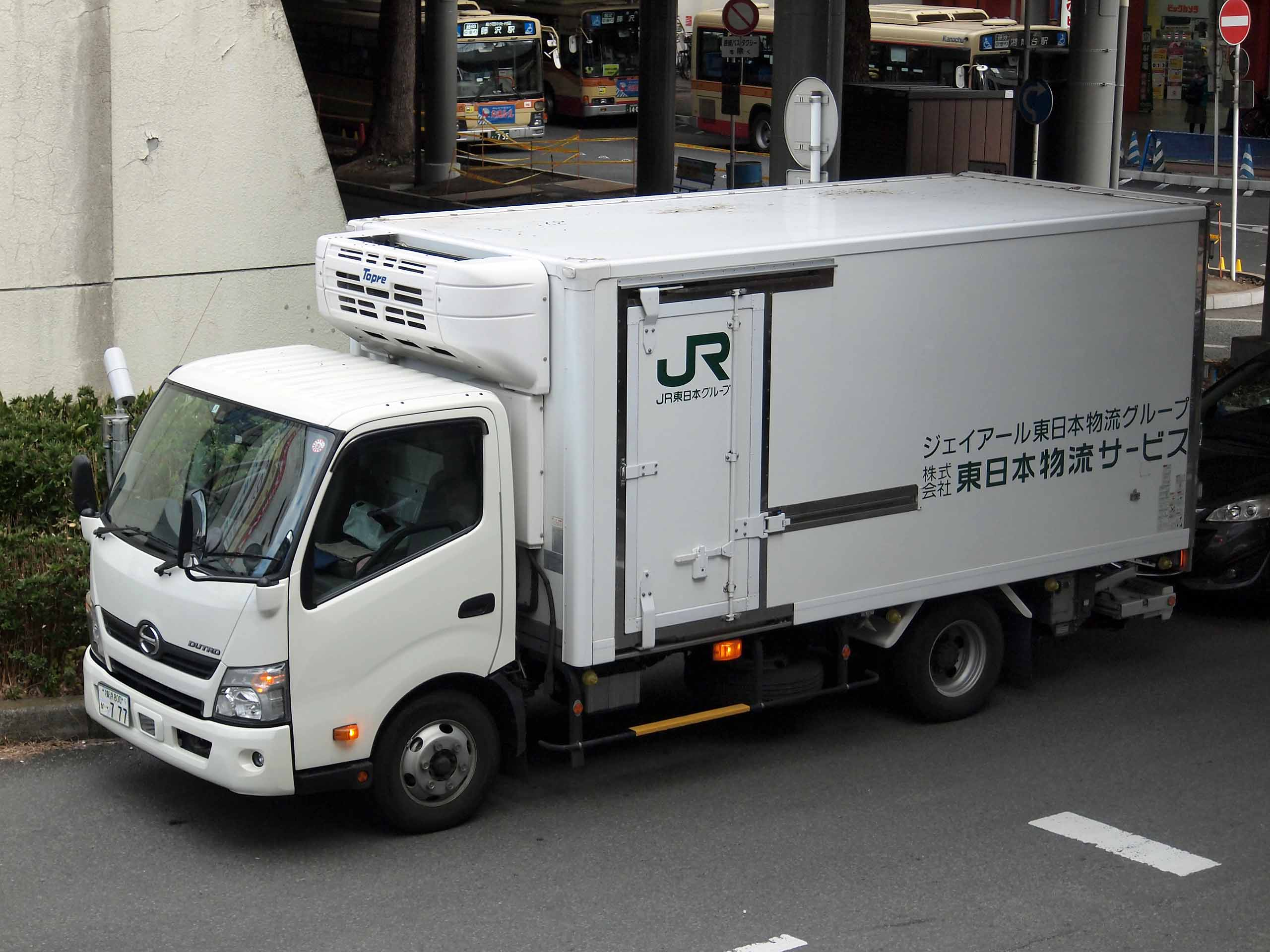
JR East carrier truck with Topre refrigeration unit

Topre was founded in April 1935 as the Tokyo Press Kogyo Co. Ltd. with a capital of JP¥300,000. From the 1930s until around the mid-1970s, the company was focused on low-tech tool and die manufacturing. In 1958, it acquired Tokyo Die-Cast Co. Ltd. and within the next four years set up two die-cast plants in Kanagawa and Hiroshima.

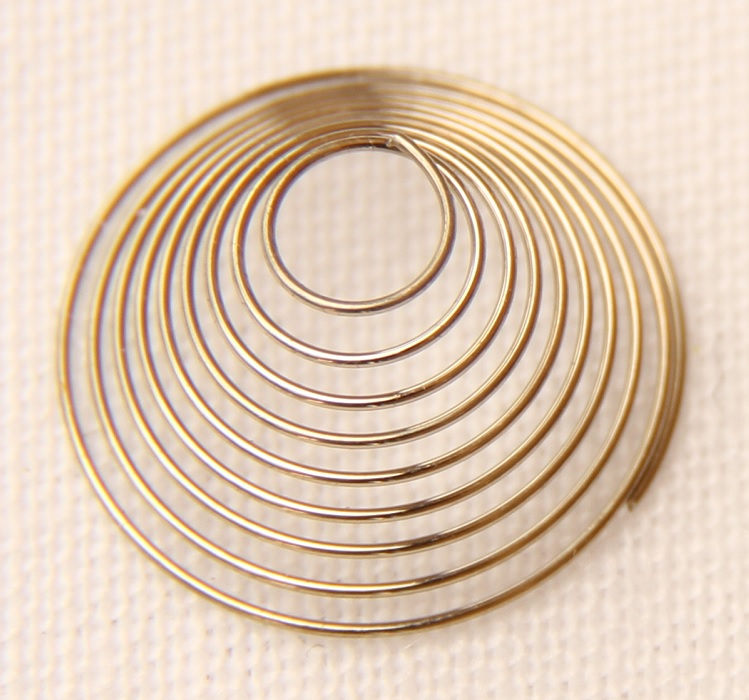
Topre conical keyboard switch spring

In 1976, the Tokyo Press Kogyo began a venture into electronics with keyboards for computer terminals. The first several of their prototype designs were unsuccessful with technology companies within Japan being reluctant to order them into production. In the late 1970s, a young engineer inspired by the katori senkō—a Japanese mosquito coil—devised a conical-spring capacitive key switch which held promise with the company's executives. After half a year of perfecting the design and another half a year of rigorous life-cycle testing, TPK took their keyboards to the Japanese market, earning orders from Hitachi, JVC, Ricoh, and others.

In 1981, TPK tasked salesperson Seiji Miwa, who set up an American office for the company three years prior, to market the design in the United States. There he was able to win accounts for NCR and Memorex, who respectively ordered 1,500 and 10,000 units of their keyboard. In October that year, the company changed its name to Topre, promoting Miwa to executive managing director of Topre's new Research and Development subsidiary.

By 1985, its Tokyo manufacturing plant was producing 30,000 units a month. At up to US$90 per keyboard (equivalent to $269.42 in 2025) in 1985, Topre's keyboards were costlier than others, which along with its overseas manufacturing put the company's ability to compete with other keyboard manufacturers in the United States into question at the time. Topre's capacitive key switches are still being manufactured for some Japanese keyboards, most notably the Happy Hacking Keyboard, as well as Topre's own Realforce. Albeit still costly, with Computer Shopper calling the Realforce too bland otherwise to justify the high price, keyboards with Topre switches are renowned by keyboard enthusiasts for their tactile feel, with David Hayward of Micro Mart calling the Realforce the "Aston Martin One-77 of the keyboard world."

Topre was a manufacturer of bumpers and dashboards for Nissan, Isuzu, and Honda automobiles in the 1990s. In June 2000, Topre gained Toyota as a client and started construction of a ¥2.5 billion plant in Fukuoka Prefecture for the manufacturing of pressed parts for Nissan and Toyota. Their automotive manufacturing division made the move to the United States in 2005, with the opening of a plant in Cullman, Alabama, with a budget of $132 million. They set up shop in Nissan's factory in Smyrna, Tennessee, in 2012 as a small operation, later moving to their own factory in the city in 2015, purchasing an additional 35 acres of factory space in 2019. In 2014, Topre moved their production of Nissan parts closer to the aforementioned company's factory in Canton, Mississippi, while retaining their Cullman plant. They also have an automotive parts factory in Springfield, Ohio.

Topre's long-standing chairman Kyohei Ishii died in 2018.
