= Unicomp =

Computer keyboard manufacturer

Unicomp GA LLC

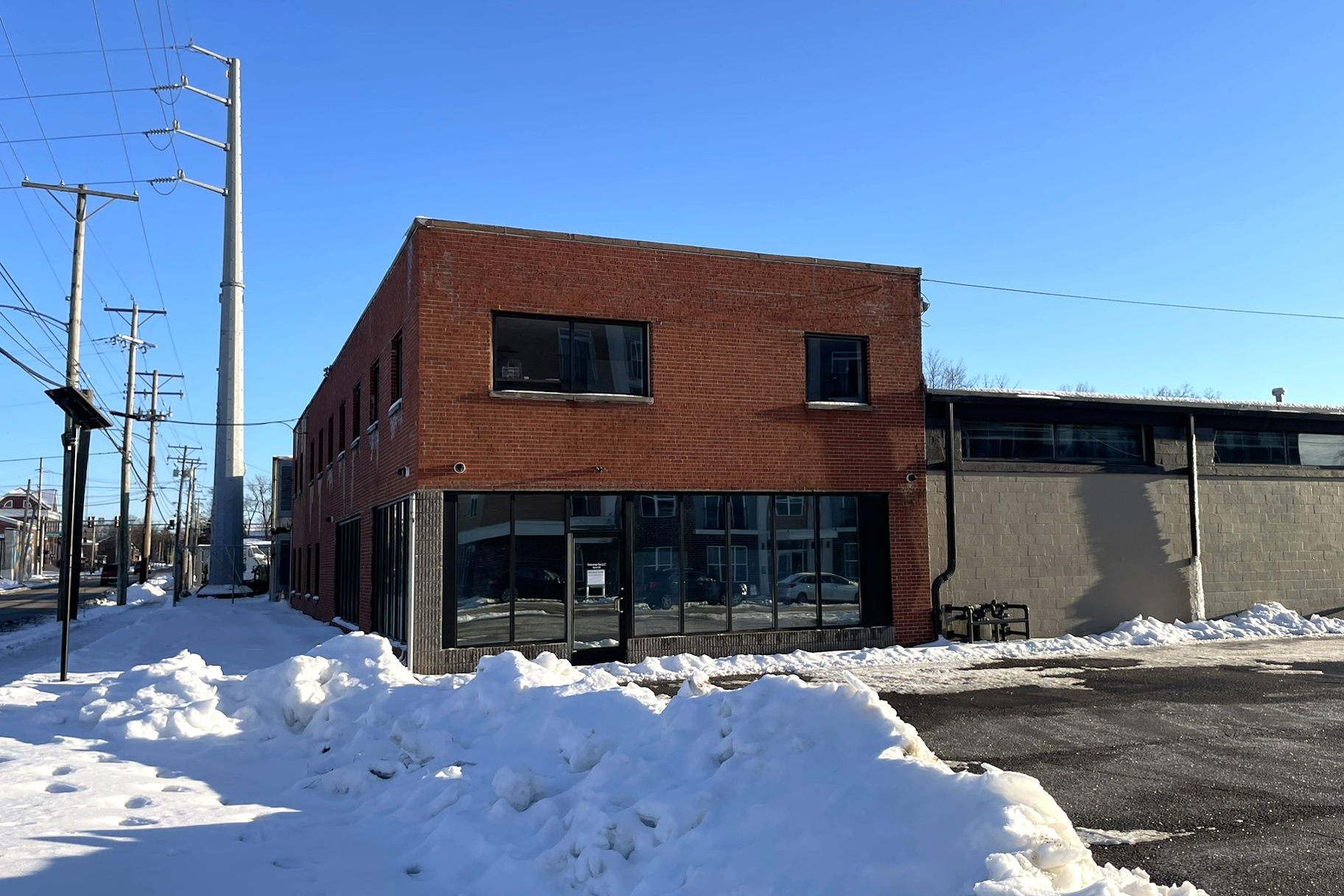
- Current headquarters in Lexington, Kentucky, pictured in 2025
- Formerly: Unicomp, Inc.
- Type: Private
- Industry: Manufacturing
- Founded: April 1996; 30 years ago in Lexington, Kentucky, United States
- Founder: Neil Muyskens
- Products: Computer keyboards
- Number of employees: 120 (2000s, peak)
- Website: pckeyboard.com

Unicomp GA LLC (formerly Unicomp, Inc.) is an American manufacturer of computer keyboards and keyboard accessories, based in Lexington, Kentucky. The company was founded in 1996 by ex-IBM and Lexmark employees. Unicomp is the current license holder and manufacturer of Model M keyboards using buckling spring key switches, the patents for which the company purchased from Lexmark in 1996.

== History ==
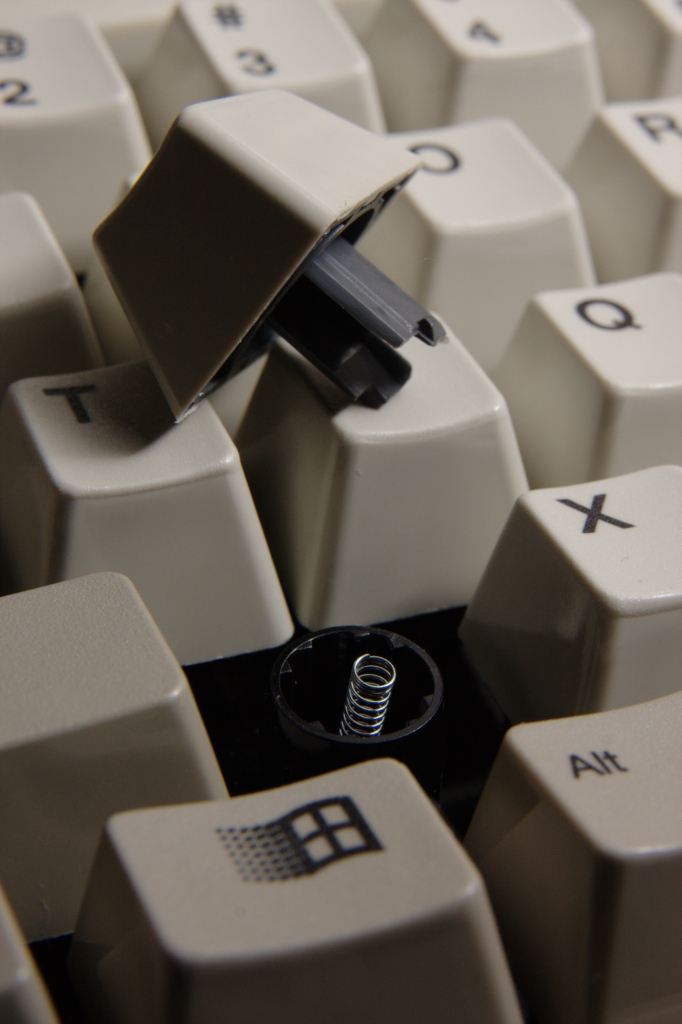
Unicomp keyboard with removed Z keycap, exposing the buckling spring

Unicomp was founded in Lexington, Kentucky, in April 1996 by Neil Muyskens (1956–2021), a former employee of IBM Information Products division in Lexington, which manufactured IBM's typewriters, printers, and computer keyboards and mice. In 1991, as part of a massive restructuring effort, IBM divested its Information Products division to the investment firm Clayton & Dubilier as part of a leveraged buyout. Clayton & Dubilier subsequently founded Lexmark, a spin-off also headquartered in Lexington which, on top of selling its own branded products, continued to operate as a contract manufacturer for IBM. One of the products Lexmark manufactured for IBM was the Model M keyboard. Introduced by IBM in 1985, the Model M was the progenitor of the modern English keyboard layout (as codified by ANSI and ISO) and was famed for the tactile and audible feedback of its buckling spring key switches. On the company's foundation, Lexmark named Muyskens product manager of its keyboard division, overseeing production of the Model M.

Following the expiration of a five-year supply agreement with IBM in March 1996, Lexmark left the keyboard market to focus on its more successful printer business. Lexmark subsequently divested its keyboard assets, selling them to both IBM and Maxi Switch. IBM afterwards transitioned to cheaper rubber dome keyboards manufactured overseas in East Asia while continuing production of the Model M at its Scotland facility for IBM's premium customers until 1999. Lexmark had initially tasked Muyskens with locating an external buyer for the division, but despite sustaining a high production volume driven by IBM's procurement, Muyskens was unable to secure a purchaser. He ultimately proposed buying out the assets himself to Lexmark, who agreed to sell the division along with its associated designs, tooling, patents, and machinery. To manage these newly acquired assets and continue production, Muyskens established Unicomp the following April. Muyskens settled on a 100,000-square-foot facility originally built by a furniture manufacturer in the 1940s in the neighborhood of Liberty Heights as Unicomp's headquarters.

Within eight months of its foundation, Unicomp had 14 employees, most of them ex-workers from Lexmark and IBM. At its peak in the 2000s, Unicomp employed over 120 workers from its Liberty Heights facility. By 2011, Unicomp was down to 25 employees, this following a layoff in early 2009 during the Great Recession. In the 2000s and early 2010s, Unicomp's primary clientele included banks, hospitals, and retail establishments, with computer enthusiasts being only a periphery market for the company. Some of Unicomp's large commercial accounts included USPS, Chrysler, and Bed Bath & Beyond. A large portion of its customer base included the financial services, an industry which faced heavy losses during the Great Recession and which led to a contraction of Unicomp's sales by 25 percent. By 2012, the company had managed to recover this loss of clientele by half. Unicomp reportedly shipped 20–30 keyboards per day that year.

Towards the end of the decade, the market for high-quality computer keyboards had increased heavily since its nadir in the early 2000s, concurrent with the growth of the enthusiast computing market, and Unicomp began updating their product roster to keep apace while also maintaining contracts with its large commercial accounts. Additionally, in 2020, Unicomp replaced the worn-out tooling for its keyboards that it had inherited from Lexmark in 1996, leading to improvements in fit and finish and reliability. In early 2024, Unicomp relocated its headquarters from Liberty Heights to the Northside neighborhood of Lexington.

== Products ==
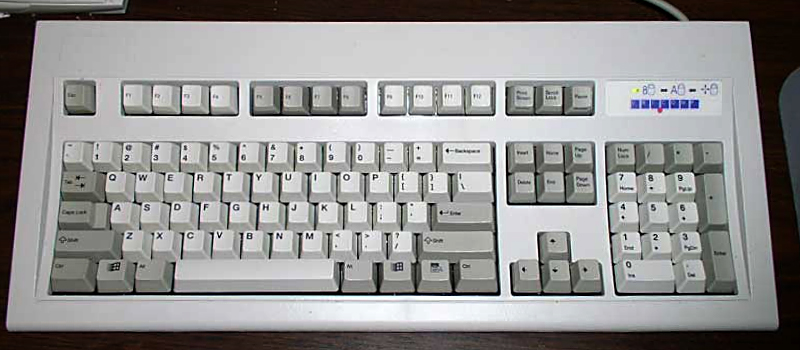
Unicomp Classic keyboard (104 keys, model number UNI0P46), manufactured 2005

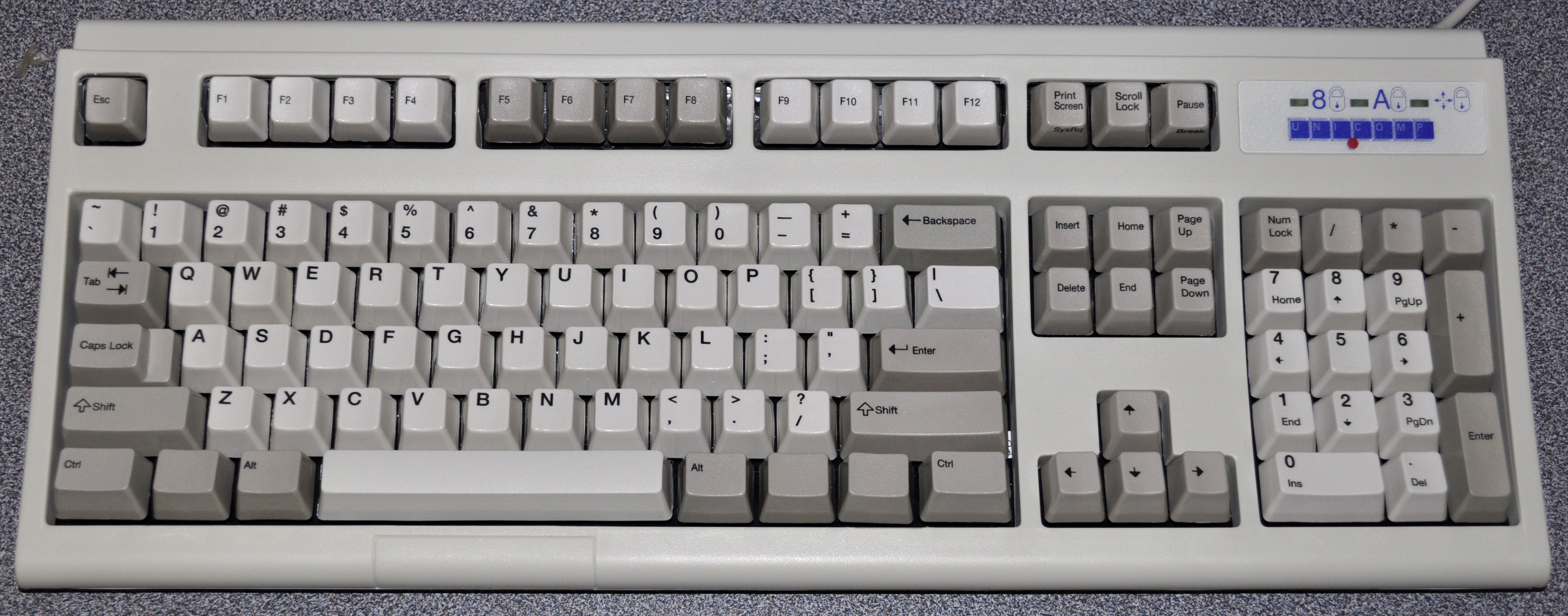
Unicomp SpaceSaver keyboard (104 keys, UNI0P4A), manufactured 2010

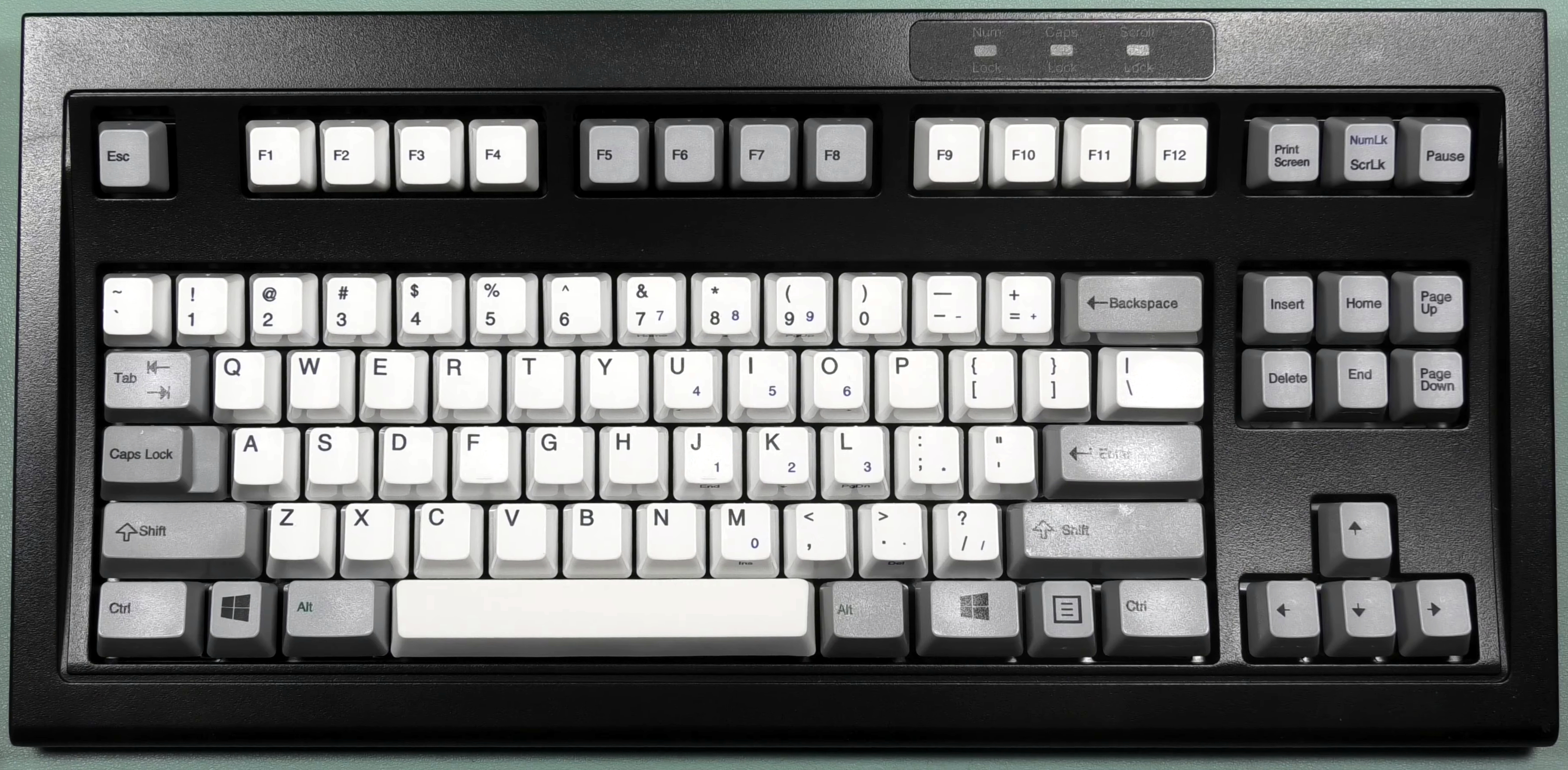
Unicomp Mini M keyboard, manufactured 2023

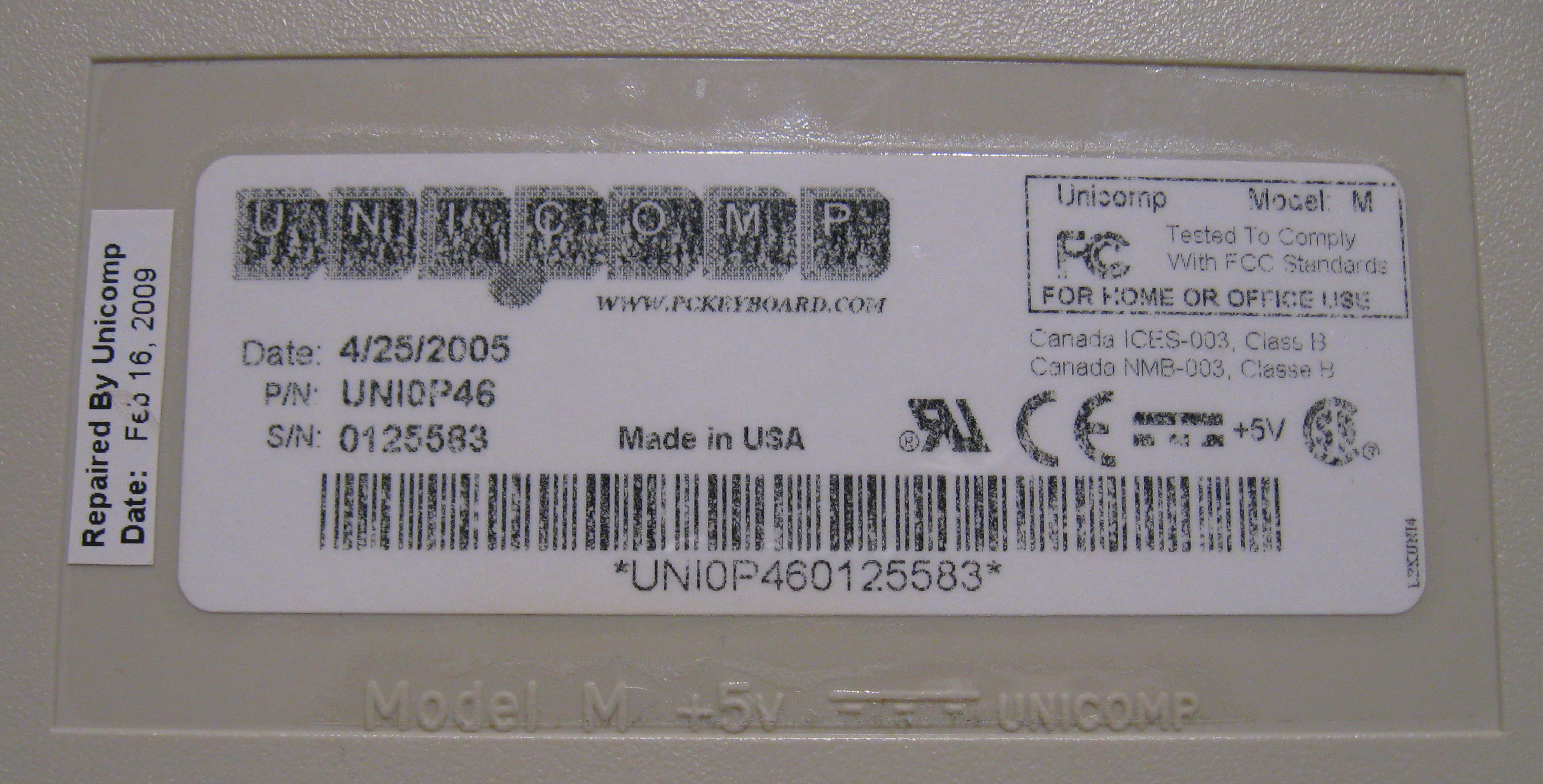
Underside of a Unicomp Classic (104 keys, model number UNI0P46); built 2005, repaired 2009

Unicomp's product line consists largely of modified designs based on late Model M keyboards produced by Lexmark. Unicomp also offers a repair service along with replacement and custom parts for virtually all Model M and similar keyboards made by IBM, Lexmark, Maxi Switch, and Unicomp.

Unicomp sources the cases and keycaps for its Model Ms from plastic molders in Kentucky, while some of the electronics are sourced from suppliers in East Asia. The plastics of Unicomp's Model Ms produced before 2001 were manufactured from an identical polybutylene terephthalate (PBT) plastic as its earlier Lexmark and IBM counterparts. Sometime in 2001, Unicomp switched to acrylonitrile butadiene styrene (ABS) plastic for the cases, while retaining the PBT blend for the keycaps. The legends of the keycaps are printed using dye sublimation, with sheets supplied from a printer in Denmark.

=== Current ===
- Classic (formerly called the Customizer), a keyboard similar to one of IBM's late Model M variants and built on the same tooling. The only changes to the Classic compared to an original Model M are the logo, optional Windows and Menu keys, optional USB connectivity (as an alternative to PS/2), and an optional black case with light gray or white keys (as an alternative to the classic "pearl" beige).
- PC 122, a 5250 122-key keyboard similar to the Classic, but with a rearranged layout and an extra set of function keys, and many keys moved to the left side of the keyboard, and the home key moved to the middle of the arrow keys.
- Ultra Classic (formerly called the SpaceSaver), a lighter, more compact version of the Classic. An Apple keyboard variant for Macs is sold under the name SpaceSaver M.
- EnduraPro, an Ultra Classic with a ThinkPad-style pointing stick and two mouse buttons at the bottom.
- New Model M, a full-sized keyboard resembling an upsized version of the Ultra Classic design. There is also a variant for Macs.
- Mini M, a tenkeyless version of the New Model M, with the lock lights moved from their traditional location above the now-absent numeric keypad to the top edge of the board above the F9–F12 keys.

=== Discontinued ===
- On-The-Stick, a 101-key Classic with a pointing stick and two mouse buttons at the bottom.
- Classic Trackball (formerly called On-The-Ball), a Classic with a trackball and two mouse buttons right above the indicator lights. It is not currently being produced due to low demand.

== See also ==
- IBM PC keyboard
- Model F keyboard
- List of mechanical keyboards
