= Cherry AG =

German computer peripheral company

- Type: Public company (Aktiengesellschaft)
- Traded as: FWB: C3RY
- Industry: Electronic switches Computer hardware
- Founded: 1953; 73 years ago
- Founder: Walter Lorain Cherry
- Headquarters: Auerbach in der Oberpfalz, Germany
- Key people: Rolf Unterberger (CEO), Bernd Wagner (CFO)
- Revenue: €167.5 million (2021)
- Operating income: €27.6 million (2021)
- Net income: €9.3 million (2021)
- Total assets: €411 million (2021)
- Number of employees: 400 (2021)
- Website: www.cherry.de

A 1959 Cherry keyboard switch being pressed

Cherry MX Red sound

Cherry MX Blue sound

Cherry AG (formerly Cherry Corporation and stylized as CHERRY) is a German computer peripheral-device maker. The company has its roots in the United States and is headquartered in Germany. It has additional offices in the United States, France, and China. They manufactured a large range of products including sensors, vibrators and automotive modules until 2008, when Peter Cherry, the son of Walter L. Cherry, sold his company to ZF Friedrichshafen AG, a German supplier to the automotive industry. Cherry was renamed ZF Electronics GmbH, while the Cherry brand was continued only for its computer input devices. Since the beginning of 2016 this product line has been operating independently on the market as the Cherry Group.

== History ==
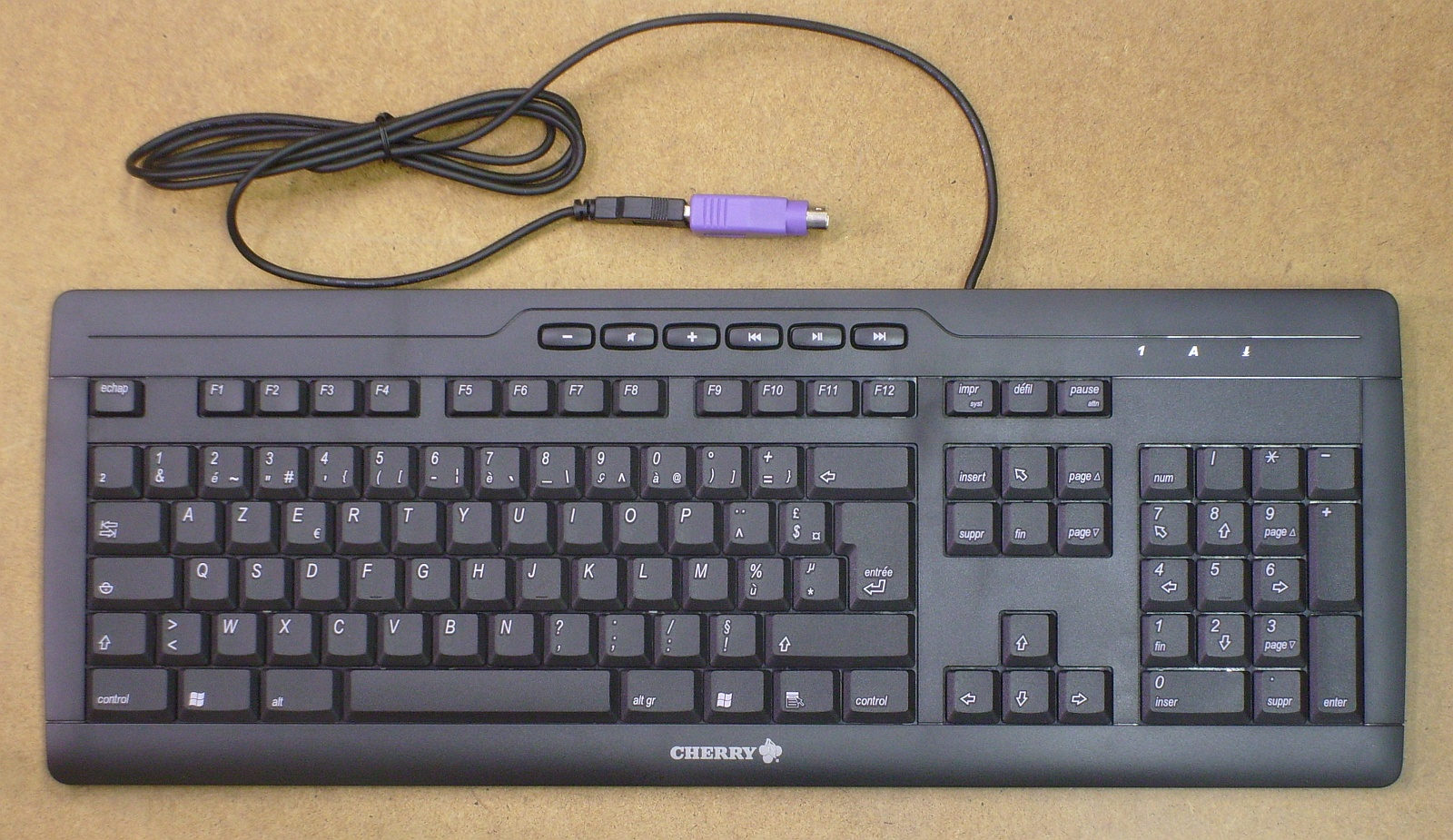
A keyboard by Cherry

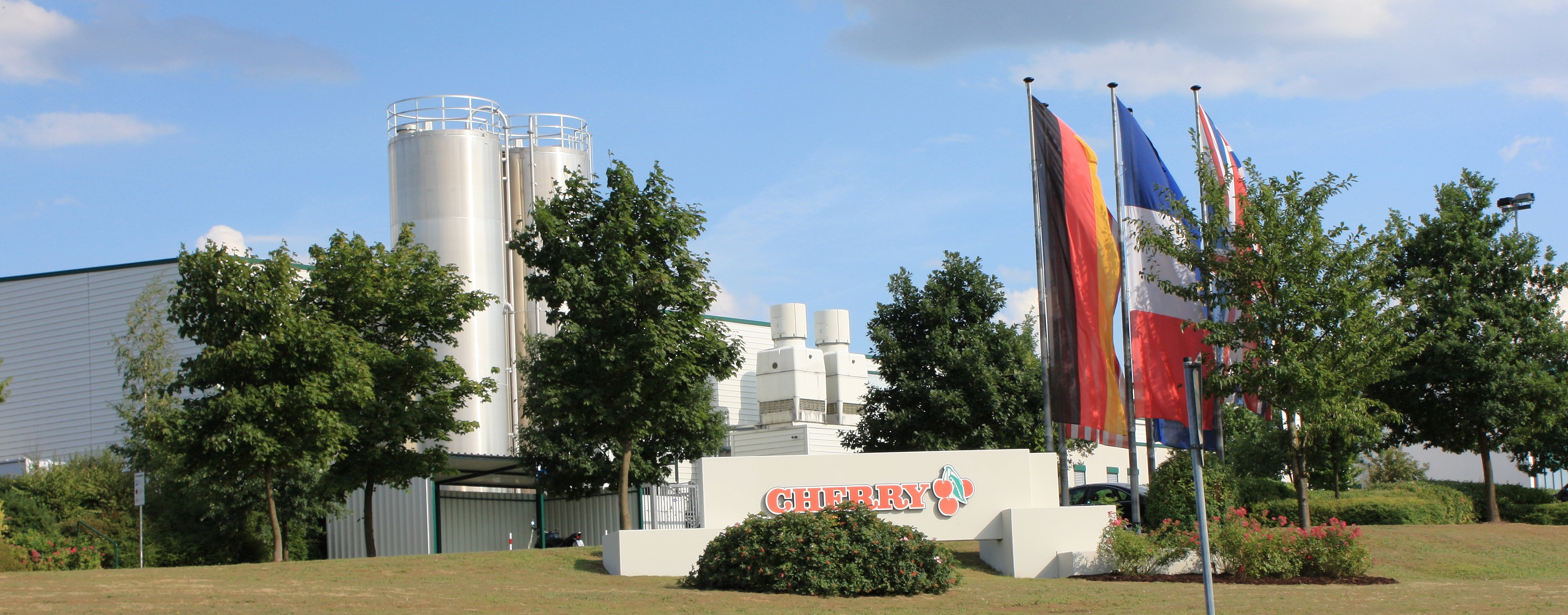
Production facility in Bayreuth

Old logo

Cherry was founded by Walter Lorain Cherry in 1953 in the basement of a restaurant in Highland Park, Illinois, USA. With the passing of its founder, his son Peter took over the ownership of the organization.

Among the 37 victims of a 1971 US Army CH-47 helicopter crash in Germany was Pfc. Samuel Mansfield Cherry, one of the three sons of the founder. In 1979, the company's headquarters were moved to Auerbach in der Oberpfalz, West Germany, which is located between the crash site at Pegnitz and Grafenwöhr Training Area. Cherry has manufactured keyboards since 1973, and claims to be the oldest keyboard manufacturer still in business.

In 2008, Cherry was bought by ZF Friedrichshafen AG and incorporated as the ZF Electronics GmbH Corporate Division. After an eight-year partnership with ZF Friedrichshafen AG, Cherry (the computer input device manufacturer) was sold to GENUI Partners in October 2016. In October 2020, Cherry was acquired by the private equity firm Argand Partners and as of June 2021 is now listed on the Frankfurt Stock Exchange as C3RY. The Cherry brand continues to be used.

In 2019, the company attracted controversy when it offered a giveaway that excluded female gamers, resulting in a boycott by some users in China. The company argued that it would still give prizes to women, amending the giveaway.

In 2023, they acquired the Swedish company Xtrfy.

Cherry maintains production facilities in Europe (most notably in Bayreuth, Germany), Asia, and the Americas. All of its products are designed and developed at the company's headquarters in Auerbach in der Oberpfalz. It also has offices in the UK, Italy, France, Hong Kong, India, Mexico, Australia and other locations, with distributors in most major countries.

== Products ==
Among Cherry's widely known products are its line of MX and ML key switches, including red, blue, and brown switches, that have been used in industrial electronics and point of sale environments since their inception in the 1980s, and more recently (~2008) by numerous manufacturers of consumer PC keyboards.

At CES 2017, the company announced an update of its "classic" G80-3000 keyboard, with a noise reduction. The Verge said that the new version "fixed a fatal flaw" with the company's mechanical keyboards – their clicking keyboard noises. According to TechCrunch, Cherry "has long been the de facto standard for mechanical keyboard switches." Three years later, the company launched its first "fully mechanical switch" intended for the "value market," or lower cost keyboards called Cherry Viola.

Currently, Cherry makes the following products:

- Keyboards
- Mice
- Card reader
- Peripheral
- MIX Technology

=== Cherry MX ===
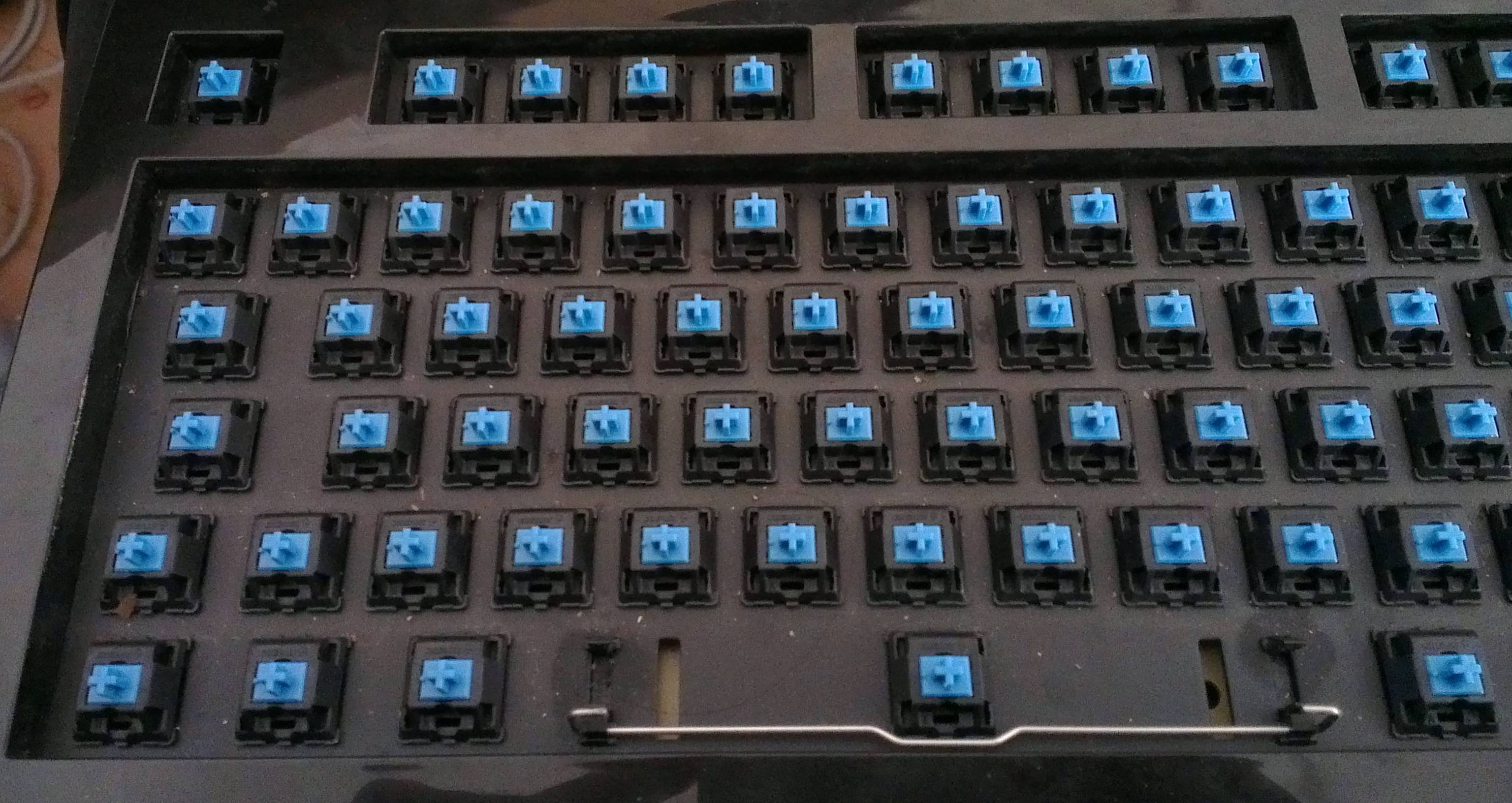
Cherry MX Blue switches on a keyboard with its keycaps removed

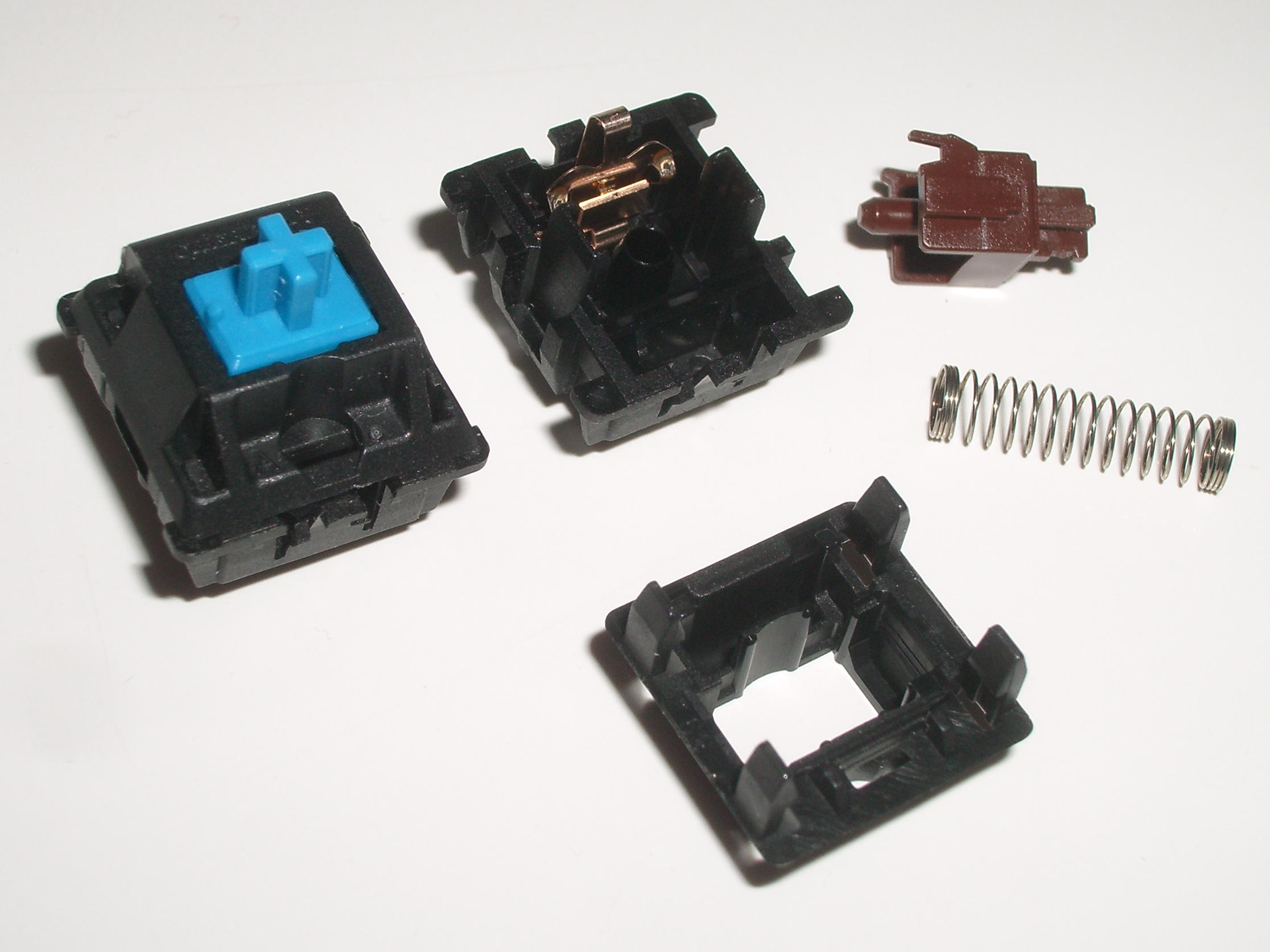
Cherry MX switches—Cherry MX Blue, assembled (left) and Cherry MX Brown, opened (right)

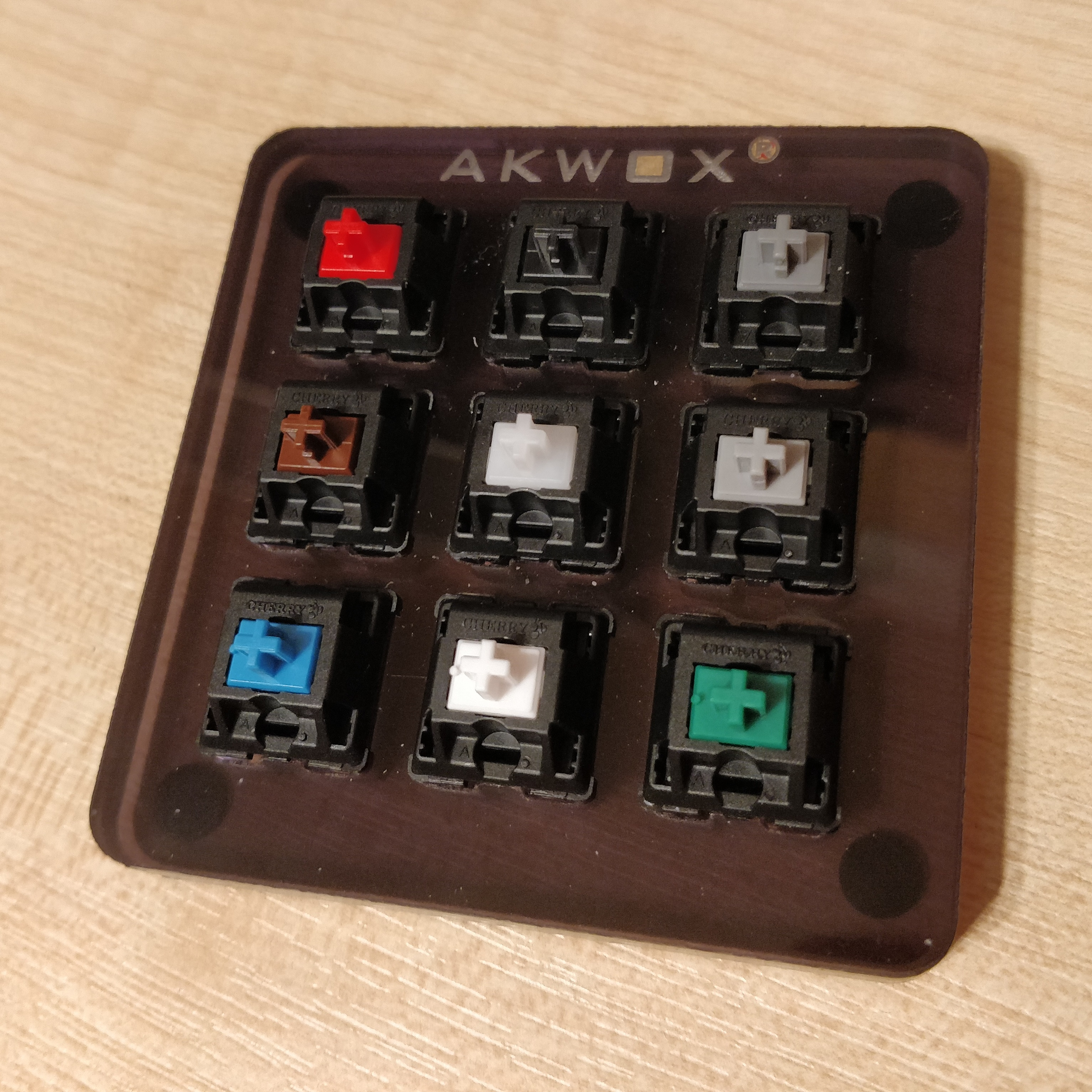
Akwox Cherry MX 9 switch sample board

Cherry “Mechanical X-Point” ("MX") switches were developed and patented in the early 1980s and first marketed around 1985. In the consumer keyboard market, Cherry MX switches are often referenced by the color of the key stem—the part of the switch below the keycap which moves downwards when pressed.

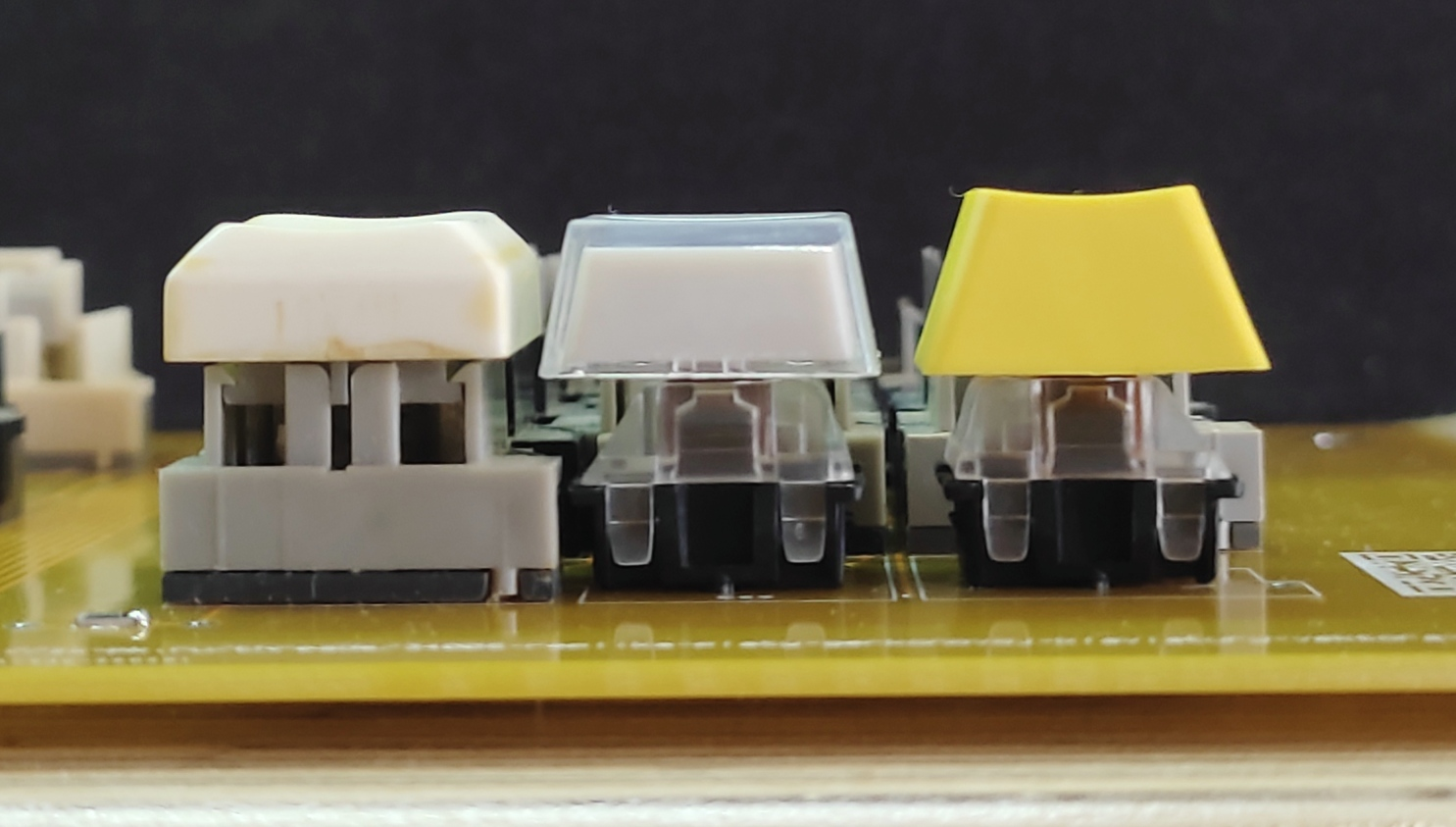
PKM 1B reed switch next to two Cherry MX

Keyboard makers such as Cooler Master, Corsair, and G.Skill use Cherry's Cherry MX switches in their designs or "imitate them," such as Razer's Kailh Green switches in the first Generation Razer Black widow Chroma. Cherry sells its own keyboards in "modest volumes." Its MX 10.0 TKL keyboard lacks the tenkey section of the keyboard. In 2018, the company introduced mechanical keyboard switches for thinner keyboards. It makes its Cherry MX Silent switches, or Pink switches, as a range on keyboards like the Corsair K70.

The most common Cherry MX switches are:

- Linear
  - Red
  - Silent Red
  - Speed Silver
  - Nature White
  - Orange
  - Black
  - Silent Black
  - Black Clear-Top
  - Linear Grey
- Tactile, non-clicky
  - Purple
  - Ergo Clear
  - Brown
  - Clear
  - Tactile Grey
- Tactile, Clicky
  - Blue
  - White
  - Green

Cherry MX Grey switches can be found in linear (which provides a smooth, consistent feel sans feedback), tactile, and clicky variants. They are distinguished by stem color, with linear being darker than tactile. The clicky version is no longer made. It is debated as to whether it even clicks, since it is not listed as a "click" switch by Cherry in their 1994 "Keymodule MX brochure", along with MX Whites, which are greased to reduce the click. Given their use primarily in large keys like Space Bar, the feel is selected to match that of the other keys on the board.

Other types of Cherry MX switches, such as Green and Grey, are used for larger keys (Space Bar, ⇧ Shift, ↵ Enter, etc.). The feel of Cherry MX Green switches are often compared to that of the "buckling spring" switches on original IBM Model M keyboards. Cherry switches have an advertised lifespan of up to 100 million actuations, depending on switch type.

The auditory and tactile nature of each switch, and the amount of force needed to actuate it, vary depending on the switch type:

Switch type	Clicky	Tactile	Actuation force	Tactile force	Actuation point	Total travel	Product code	Type
Blossom	No	No	0.35 N	N/A	2.0 mm	3.8 mm	MX2A-LC9D	Normal
Speed Silver	No	No	0.45 N	N/A	1.2 mm	3.4 mm	MX1A-51xx	Normal
Northern Light	No	No	0.45 N	N/A	1.6 mm	3.7 mm	MX2A-8C7D	Normal
Silent Red	No	No	0.45 N	N/A	1.9 mm	3.7 mm	MX3A-L1xx	Normal
Red	No	No	0.45 N	N/A	2.0 mm	4.0 mm	MX1A-L1xx	Normal
Nature White	No	No	0.55 N	N/A	2.0 mm	4.0 mm	MX1A-41NA	Normal
Orange	No	No	0.55 N	N/A	2.0 mm	4.0 mm	MX2A-LC3W	Normal
Silent Black	No	No	0.60 N	N/A	1.9 mm	3.7 mm	MX3A-11xx	Normal
Black	No	No	0.60 N	N/A	2.0 mm	4.0 mm	MX1A-11xx	Normal
Black Clear-Top	No	No	0.635 N	N/A	2.0 mm	4.0 mm	MX2A-61NW	Normal
Linear Grey	No	No	0.80 N	N/A	2.0 mm	4.0 mm	MX1A-21xx	Larger keys
Purple	No	Yes	0.35 N	0.55 N	2.0 mm	4.0 mm	MX2A-V1NW	Normal
Ergo Clear	No	Yes	0.40 N	0.55 N	2.0 mm	4.0 mm	MX2A-Hxxx	Normal
Brown	No	Yes	0.45 N	0.55 N	2.0 mm	4.0 mm	MX1A-G1xx	Normal
Clear	No	Yes	0.55 N	0.65 N	2.0 mm	4.0 mm	MX1A-C1xx	Larger keys
Tactile Grey	No	Yes	0.80 N	0.80 N	2.0 mm	4.0 mm	MX1A-D1xx	Larger keys
Blue	Yes	Yes	0.50 N	0.60 N	2.2 mm	4.0 mm	MX1A-E1xx	Normal
White / new White	Yes	Yes	0.50 N / 0.70 N	0.60 N / 0.80 N	2.0 mm	4.0 mm	MX1A-A1xx	Normal / Larger keys
Green	Yes	Yes	0.70 N	0.80 N	2.2 mm	4.0 mm	MX1A-F1xx	Larger keys

=== Cherry ML ===
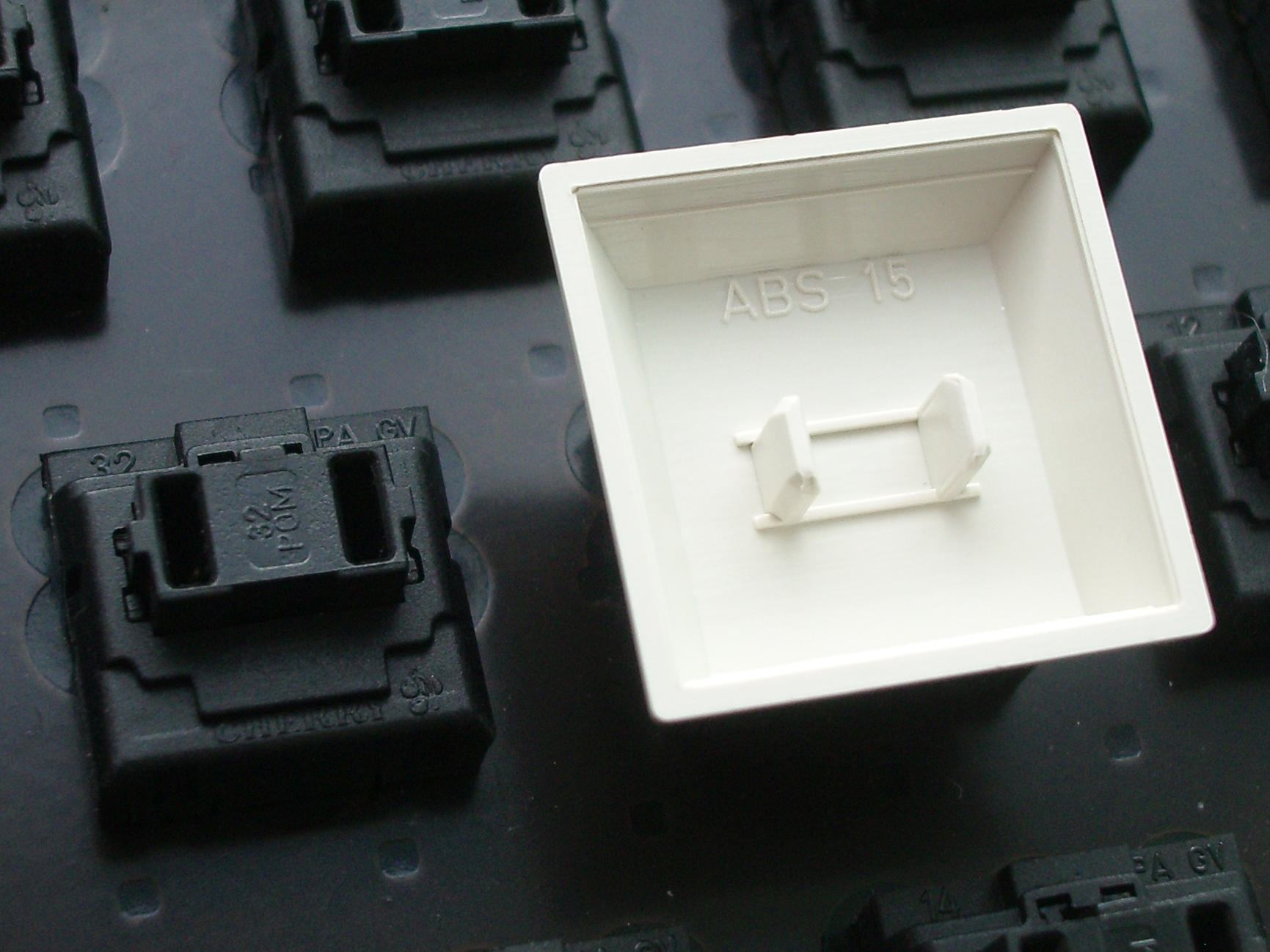
Cherry ML switch and keycap

Cherry Mechanical Low-profile (ML) switches are available in a tactile variant, with force and operating characteristics similar to that of Cherry MX Brown switches, but with shortened travel. The rated service life of ML switches is 20 million keystrokes, approximately 1/5 that of the rated MX life. The ML switch was developed to reduce the overall height above the board; while the MX switch stands 15.6 mm (0.61 in) above the board, the ML switch shortens that to 6.9 mm (0.27 in); in addition, the total travel is reduced to 3.0 mm (0.12 in). The nominal actuation point is approximately halfway through the total travel, at 1.5 mm (0.059 in), with 0.45 N and 0.50 N actuation and tactile point forces, respectively.

In 2018, Cherry introduced the MX Low Profile switch to supplement the ML switch.

== Awards ==
In 2008, Cherry's production facility in Bayreuth received the Bayerischer Qualitätspreis 2008 award. At the end of 2006, Cherry received the Automotive Lean Production Award of the German economy magazine Automobil-Produktion. In 2005, Cherry GmbH in Auerbach received the Industrial Excellence Award as best European industrial facility.

== See also ==
- List of mechanical keyboards
- Alps Electric
