= HP X-Terminals =

Line of X terminals from Hewlett Packard

HP X-Terminals are a line of X terminals from Hewlett-Packard introduced in the early- to mid-1990s, including the 700/X and 700/RX, Envizex and Entria, and the Envizex II and Entria II. They were often sold alongside PA-RISC-based HP 9000 Unix systems. The primary use case was connecting several graphical consoles to a single server or workstation to allow multiple users access the same (expensive) processing system from (less expensive) terminal systems. These X terminals all allowed high-resolution, color-graphics access to the main server from which they downloaded their operating system and necessary program files. All models featured limited expandability, in most cases additional I/O options for peripherals and memory for more programs or local storage. HP did not use its own PA-RISC platform for these systems, the first design used an Intel CISC processor, while all later systems used RISC platforms, first Intel i960 and later the popular MIPS.

These 1990s X terminals, together with offerings from many other vendors from that time, were precursors to thin computing: the use of small dumb front-end systems for I/O and a larger processing system as back-end, shared by many concurrent users.

== 700/X ==
These were the first X-Terminals HP produced, featuring a similar case to that of some HP 9000/300 (Motorola 68000-based) workstations. They were driven by an obscure CPU combination, an Intel 186 with a TI DSP as video coprocessor.

- CPU: 16 MHz Intel 80186 with a 60 MHz Texas Instruments DSP as video processor
- RAM: 1MB on board, 9MB maximum; one slot takes up to 8MB modules of unknown type
- Video RAM: Unknown
- Maximum video resolution/color-depth: 1024×768/8-bit
- I/O connectors: RS-232 serial, HIL and two PS/2 for keyboard/mouse devices, AUI and BNC 10 Mbit Ethernet connectors and VGA video connector
- Expansion: Unknown

== 700/RX ==
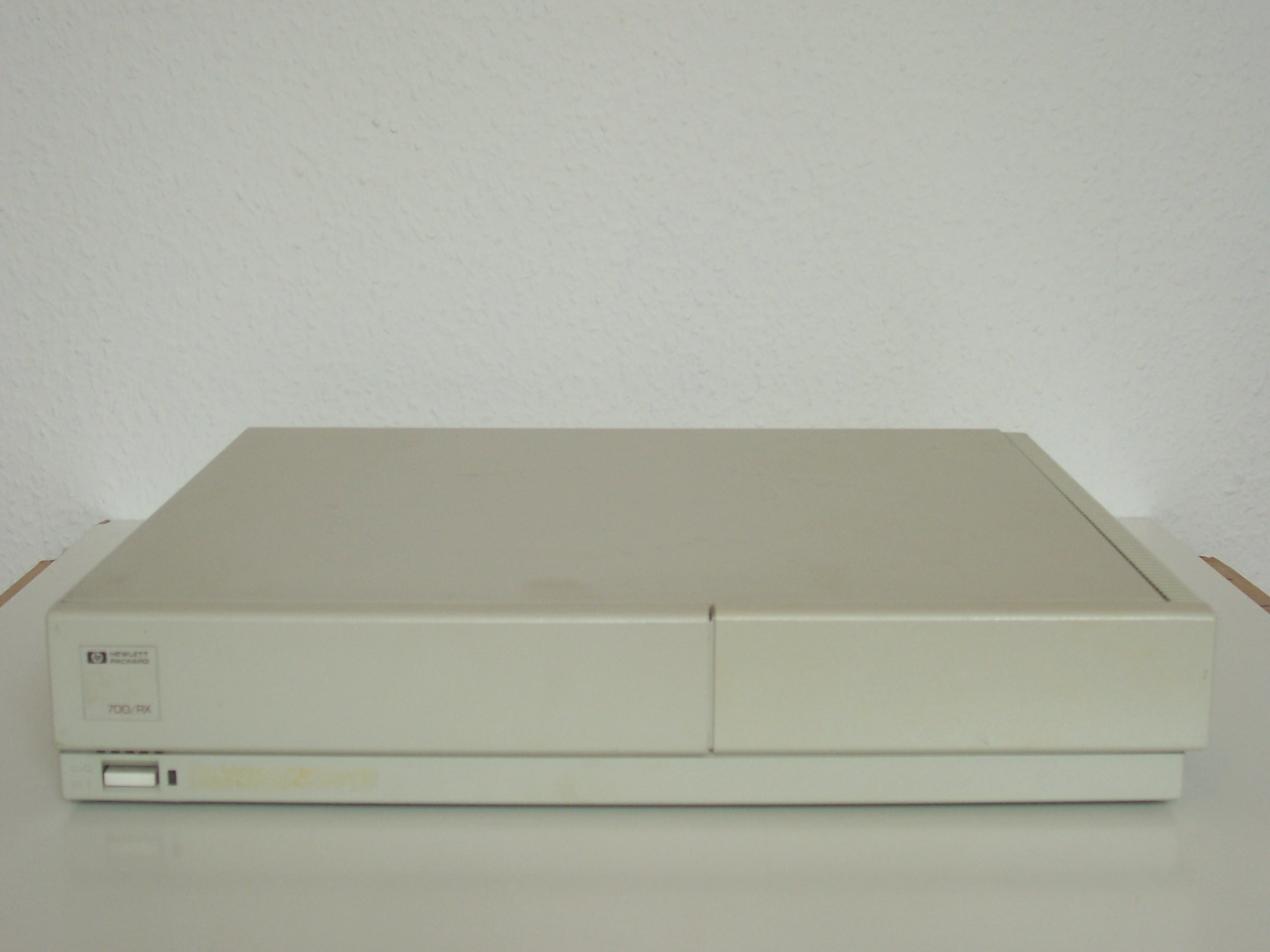
HP 700/RX C2708B

These are the direct successors to the 700/X line of X-Terminals and changed the architecture significantly. They were the first in a line of terminals to be driven by an Intel i960 RISC CPU and introduced a case which also was used on later systems. They have a (albeit very quiet) fan.

Several submodels were available, featuring different video-options:

- 16Ca: 1 MB video RAM, max. 1028×768 resolution, 8-bit color-depth
- 19Ca: 2 MB video RAM, max. 1280×1024 resolution, 8-bit color-depth
- 14Ci/16Ci/17Ci: 1 MB video RAM, max. 1028×768 resolution, 8-bit color-depth
- 19Mi: 0.2 MB video RAM, max. 1280×1024 resolution, monographics

All models have these base features in common:

- CPU: 22 MHz Intel i960CA with 1KB instruction cache
- RAM: 2 MB on board, 34 MB maximum; two slots take each up to 16 MB 72-pin non-parity SIMMs
- I/O connectors: RS-232 serial, HIL and two PS/2 for keyboard/mouse devices, parallel for printer, AUI and BNC 10 Mbit Ethernet and VGA video connector
- Expansion: slot for a Boot-ROM cartridge

== Entria ==
The Entrias were the low-cost line of X-Terminals, featuring the same architecture as the 700/RX terminals, but in a plastic case the same style as the HP 9000/712 workstation. They are very small and quiet.

The Entrias were available in different video configurations, depending on the exact model:

- 0.6 MB video RAM: max. resolution of 1024×768 with grayscale graphics
- 1 MB video RAM: max. resolution of 1024×768 with 8-bit color depth
- 2 MB video RAM: max. resolution of 1280×1024 with 8-bit color depth

Common:

- CPU: Intel i960CA with 1 KB instruction cache
- RAM: 4 MB on board, 68 MB maximum; two slots take each up to 32 MB 72-pin non-parity SIMMs
- I/O connectors: RS-232 serial, two PS/2 for keyboard/mouse devices, parallel for printer, TP and BNC 10 Mbit Ethernet and VGA video connector
- Expansion: none

== Envizex ==
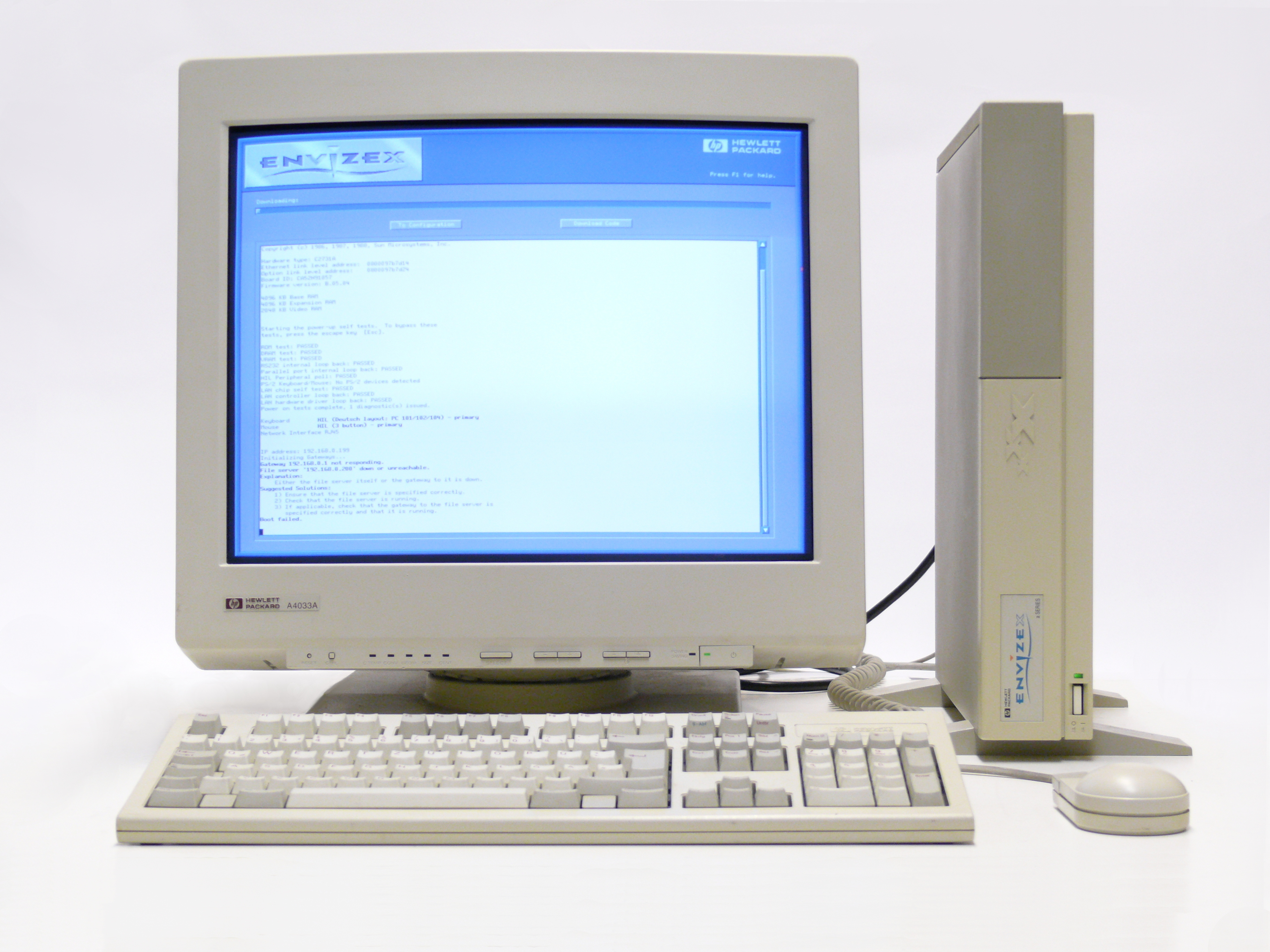
An Envizex a SERIES X-Terminal

The Envizex were the successors to the 700/RX terminals, featuring the same flat pizzabox case and a slightly modified architecture with a faster version of the Intel i960 RISC CPU. They have a (very quiet) fan inside.

Three different series were available which featured different speeds of the CPU:

- i SERIES: 25 MHz Intel i960CF with 4 KB instruction and 1 KB data cache
- a SERIES: 28 MHz Intel i960CF with 4 KB instruction and 1 KB data cache
- p SERIES: 33 MHz Intel i960CF with 4 KB instruction and 1 KB data cache

Common aspects:

- RAM: a and i SERIES: 4 MB on board, 132 MB maximum; four slots take each up to 32 MB 72-pin non-parity SIMMs. p SERIES: 6 MB on board, 102 MB maximum; three slots take each up to 32 MB 72-pin non-parity SIMMs
- Video RAM: 2 MB
- Maximum video resolution/color-depth: 1280×1024 (i SERIES might do only 1024×768) 8-bit
- I/O connectors: two RS-232 serial, HIL and two PS/2 for keyboard/mouse devices, parallel for printer, TP, AUI and BNC 10 Mbit Ethernet and VGA video connector
- Expansion: They offer a range of expansion options:
  - 3.5″ PC floppy drive
  - CD-quality audio support
  - Either one of the following three cards:
    - SCSI/ROM adapter card
    - Token Ring adapter
    - 100VG AnyLan adapter (HP-proprietary 100 MBit networking)
  - They also have two PCMCIA sockets for:
    - Boot-ROM card
    - SRAM cards which contain fonts or a local copy of the X server (no network download necessary)

== Entria II ==
These were the successors of the low-cost Entria X-Terminals, keeping their HP 9000/712-style small footprint plastic case. The system architecture was changed completely and is shared with the later Envizex II terminals. It is based around a NEC R4300 CPU and PCI-based I/O devices.

- CPU: 100 MHz NEC R4300
- RAM: 64 MB maximum; two slots take each up to 32 MB 168-pin DIMMs (PC66/100/133 DIMMs in different sizes can be used, but only 8 MB of each module will be available; the larger modules (16 and 32 MB) were HP-proprietary)
- Video RAM: 2 MB
- Maximum video resolution/color-depth: 1280×1024/8-bit
- I/O connectors: RS-232 serial, two PS/2 for keyboard/mouse devices, parallel for printer, TP Ethernet (probably 10 Mbit) connector and VGA video connector
- Expansion: none

== Envizex II ==
These are the bigger brothers of the Entria II X-Terminals, driven by the same R4300 MIPS CPU and PCI I/O architecture. The case was redesigned, is very easy to open and does not have any fans, making the terminal rather quiet.

- CPU: 133 MHz NEC R4300
- RAM: 96 MB maximum; three slots take each up to 32 MB 168-pin DIMMs (PC66/100/133 DIMMs in different sizes can be used, but only 8 MB of each module will be available; the larger modules (16 and 32 MB) were also HP-proprietary)
- Video RAM: 2 or 4 MB VSIMM
- Video chipset: ATI Mach64
- Maximum video resolution/color-depth: 1600×1200/16-bit
- I/O connectors: two RS-232 serial, two PS/2 and USB for keyboard/mouse devices, TP Ethernet connector and EVC video connector (requires an adapter-cable to use standard VGA monitors)
- Expansion:
  - 3.5″ PC floppy drive
  - Audio Kit with telephone I/O
  - Flash DIMMs card for booting and storing configuration and font files
  - 100VG AnyLan PCI card
  - 100 Mbit Ethernet PCI card
  - Combined BNC and AUI card (expands the onboard NIC)

== Software ==
These X terminals/stations run a proprietary operating system from HP — Netstation, formerly Enware, with some versions apparently based on VxWorks (probably those with RISC support).

This software runs on theoretically any Unix system, native support is available for HP-UX 10, HP-UX 11, IBM AIX and Solaris 2.x. A generic installation image is provided for other Unix flavors; this can be used to install the software via the provided installation shell script on for instance various Linux or BSD flavors.

=== Netstation Version 7.1 ===
The older Enware/Netstation Version 7.1, HP product B.07.11, supports the following i960-based terminals:

- 700/RX
- Entria
- Envizex

It was downloadable from a public HP FTP service (hprc.external.hp.com/B.07.11/), which however was apparently discontinued.

Read the included documentation and technical reference and refer to the installation instructions. Generally, a Unix server is needed from which the station can boot its kernel and load its X server. This is done via TFTP; the station can be managed locally via a configuration screen or remotely on the server via customizable configuration files.

=== Netstation Version 9.0 ===
The most current available Netstation version is 9.0, HP product B.09.11. This version supports the newer MIPS-based X-Terminals:

- Entria II
- Envizex II

Same as with the older Netstation software, version 9.0 was available from a HP FTP service, which was discontinued. (See above)

The newer X-Terminals (IIs) can boot in different ways, over a NFS mount, a SMB share or plain TFTP. Included in the Netstation software is a native Java environment which makes execution of local Java applets on the terminal possible.
