= Shielded data link connector =

Electrical signal connector

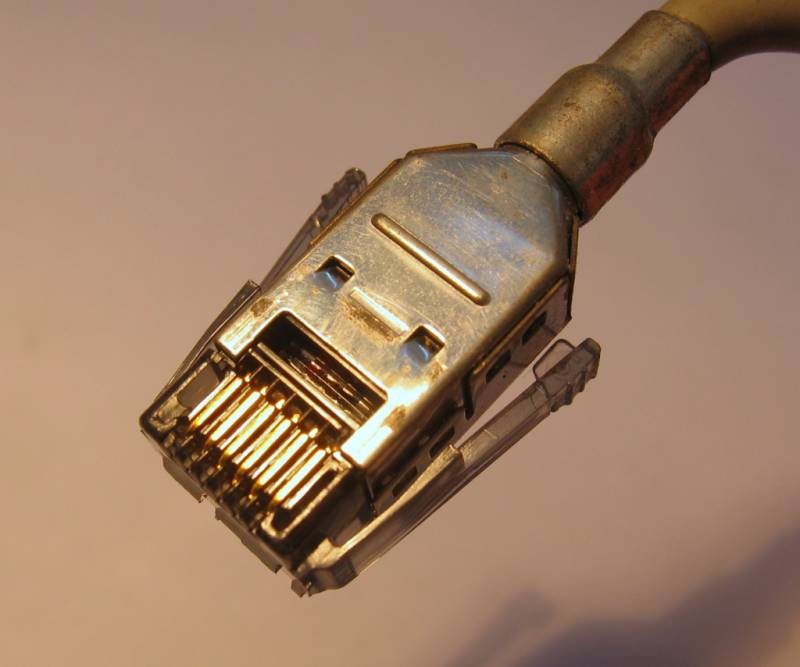
SDL plug with six pins

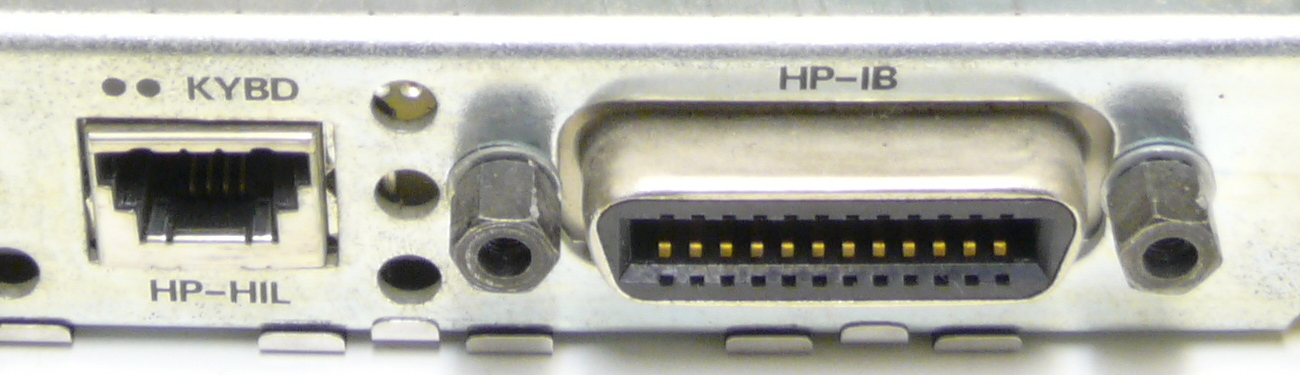
A 4-pin SDL socket used for a HIL bus connector for keyboards next to a HP-IB connector on an HP9000-310 workstation

A shielded data link (SDL) connector is a type of electrical connector in which the signal pins are surrounded by a metal shield. The connector was designed by AMP (now TE Connectivity) and is available with a range of pins (4 to 16). It also features a locking mechanism and is available in differently keyed plugs that correspond to the proper socket.

It has been used by several different products, most notably on the original IBM Model M keyboard with a detachable cable, on the IBM SurePos line of devices, and on HP HIL devices (such as keyboards and mice). The connector was also used by AMF for their line of Accuscore automatic scoring systems for bowling. Some of the SDL connectors are still manufactured but are no longer common on consumer electronic devices.

== See also ==
- Modular connector
