= Model M keyboard =

Series of computer keyboards

Model M
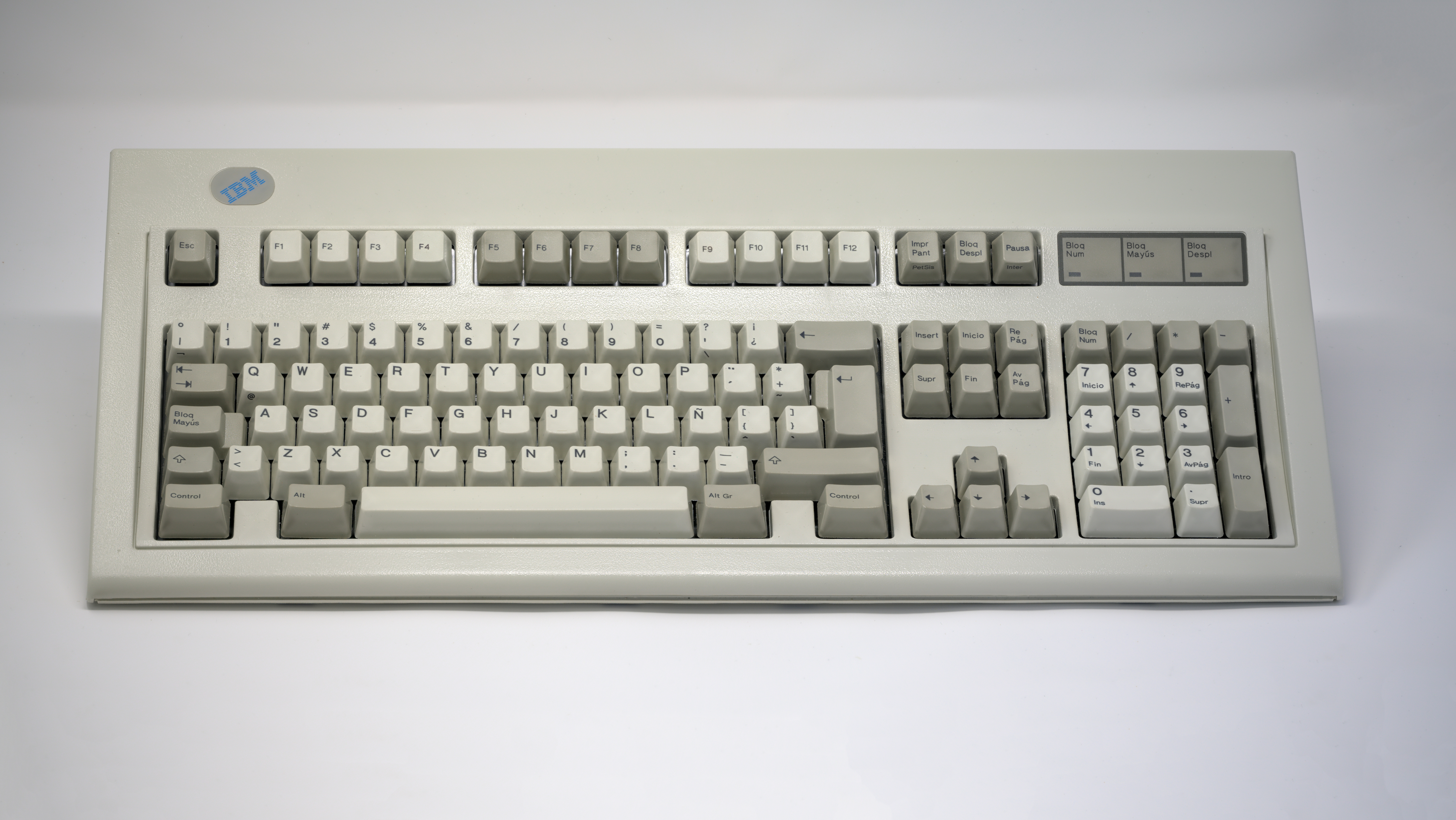
- An IBM Model M manufactured in the early 1990s
- Part no.: Various
- Branding: IBM, Lexmark, Unicomp, others
- Manufacturer: IBM, Lexmark International, Maxi Switch, Unicomp
- Product family: IBM Model M
- Layouts: 101/102/104 ANSI, 102/103/105/122 ISO
- Keyswitches: Buckling-spring, Dome-switch keyboard
- Keycaps: Dye-sublimated (white/grey keycaps) or pad-printed (black) PBT
- Interface: PS/2, AT, Terminal, USB
- Weight: 2.0–2.5 kg
- Introduced: 1985

IBM Model M (1986)
The sound of an IBM Model M from 1986, with the characteristic buckling spring sound.

IBM Model M13 (1999)
The sound of an IBM Model M13 from 1999—quieter, with less spring noise.

IBM Model F (1984)
A 1984 IBM Model F, for comparison with the Model M. Although it too uses buckling springs, its sound is significantly sharper and more metallic due to the spring plates directly contacting the PCB.

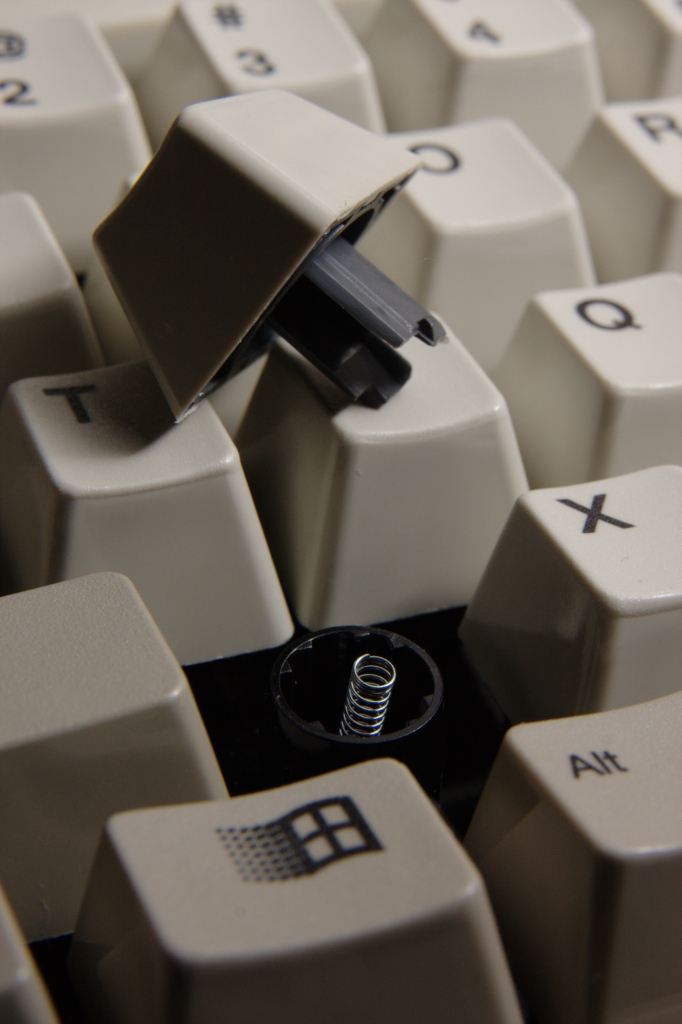
Unicomp Model M with removed "z" key. The buckling spring is visible.

Model M keyboards are a group of computer keyboards designed and manufactured by IBM starting in 1985, and later by Lexmark International, Maxi Switch, and Unicomp. The keyboard's different variations have their own distinct characteristics, with the vast majority having a buckling-spring key design and uniform profile, swappable keycaps. Model M keyboards are notable among computer enthusiasts and frequent typists due to their durability, typing-feel consistency, and their tactile and auditory feedback.

The popularity of the IBM PC and its successors made the Model M's design influential: Almost all later general-purpose computer keyboards mimicked its key layout and other aspects of its ergonomics. The layout was standardized by ANSI in 1988 and ISO in 1994. Later versions of their standards specified or provisioned for minor additions—most notably the Windows key and Menu key.

The Model M is regarded as a classic and durable piece of hardware. Although the computers and computer peripherals produced concurrently with them are considered obsolete, many Model M keyboards are still in use due to their physical durability and the continued validity of their ANSI 101-key and ISO 102-key layouts, through the use of a PS/2-female-to-USB-male adapter with a built-in interface converter. Since their original popularity, new generations have discovered their unique functionality and aesthetics.

It is estimated that during the IBM and Lexmark years, over 10 million Model Ms were shipped. Their mass-market success ended in the 1990s amid an industry-wide switchover to lower-cost rubber dome over membrane keyboards. IBM stopped producing the Model M keyboard in 1996.

== History ==
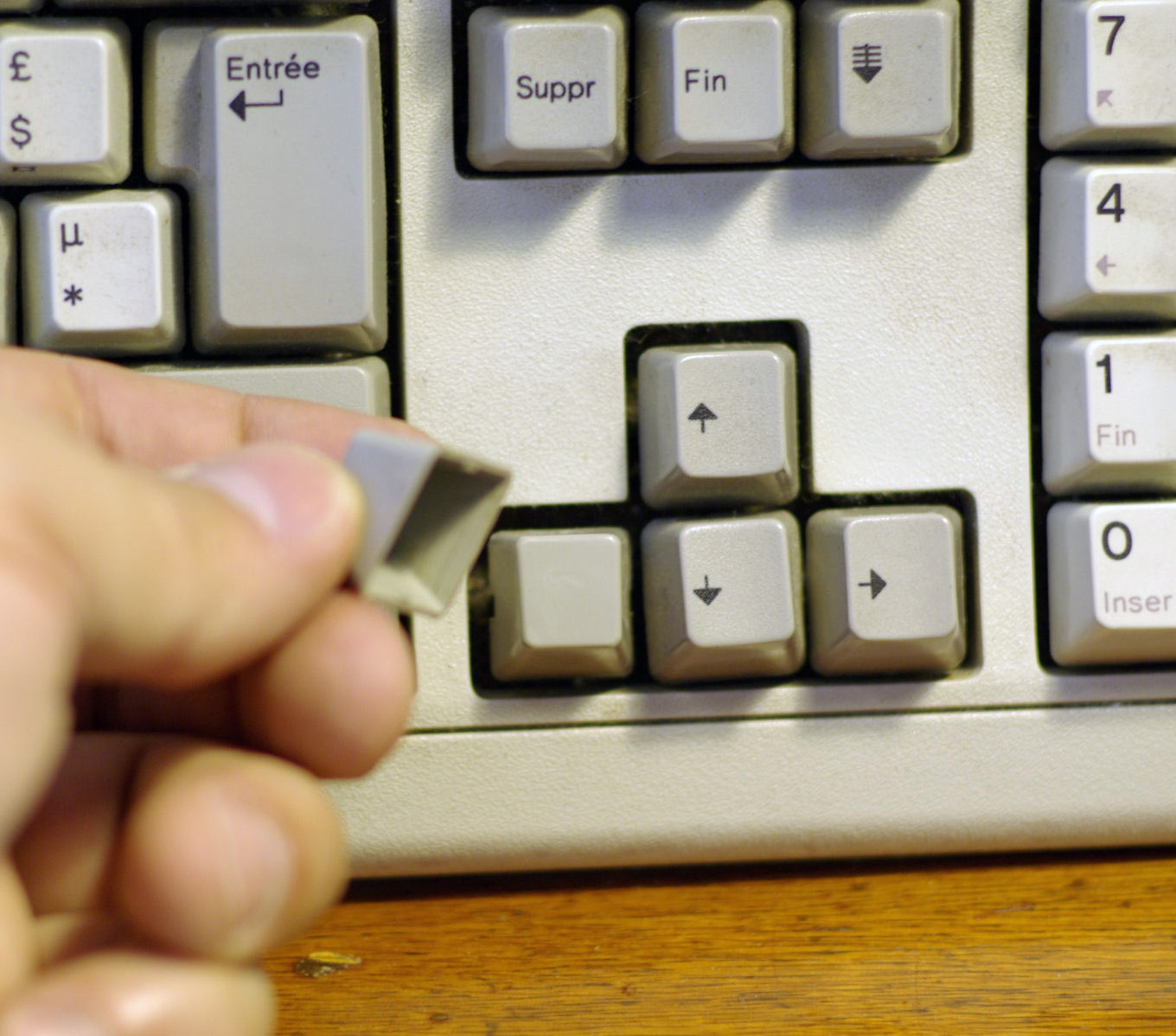
Keycap in a French Model M

The Model M keyboard was designed to be less expensive to produce than the Model F keyboard it replaced. Principal design work was done at IBM in 1983–1984, drawing on a wide range of user feedback, ergonomic studies, and examination of competing products. Its key layout, significantly different from the Model F's, owed much (including notably the inverted-T arrangement of its arrow keys) to the LK-201 keyboard shipped with the VT220 serial terminal.

Production of Model M keyboards began in 1985. They were often bundled with new IBM computers. While today primarily associated with the IBM PC and its successors, it actually first shipped with the 3161 terminal. From 1986 the PC AT and PC XT shipped with the Model M. The keyboard was deployed across several other IBM product lines as well, notably including the 5250 terminal and the RS/6000.

They were produced at IBM plants in Lexington, Kentucky; Greenock, Scotland; and Guadalajara, Mexico. The most common variant is the IBM Enhanced Keyboard identified by IBM assembly part number 1391401, the U.S. English layout keyboard bundled with the IBM Personal System/2. Until around 1993, most Model Ms included a coiled, detachable cable, with either an AT (pre-1987) or PS/2 connector, in 5- and 10-foot lengths (1.5 and 3 meters). From about 1994 onwards, flat non-detachable cables were used to reduce manufacturing costs; however, IBM retained its 101-key layout, never implementing the Microsoft Windows keys common on other keyboards after the release of Windows 95. In 2000, Unicomp designed a 104-key Model M with Windows keys, replicating the bottom row of other keyboards made by NMB and Chicony at the time, which was standardized by the OADG the same year. In 2013, this variant was discontinued in place of a variant that replicated Topre's Realforce 103U (released in 2007, itself a variation of the US national standard ANSI-INCITS 154-1988 (R1999)), with only one Windows key on the left, and a variant of this with its space bar shortened on the right-side to incorporate a second Windows key.

On March 27, 1991, IBM divested a number of its hardware manufacturing operations, including keyboard production, forming Lexmark International. Lexmark continued manufacturing Model M keyboards in the United States, United Kingdom, and Mexico, with IBM as their major customer. Many of these keyboards are identified by IBM assembly part numbers 52G9658, 52G9700, 71G4644, 82G2383, and 42H1292, which were bundled with IBM PS/ValuePoint and IBM PC Series.

Over the next four years, cost pressure led to several minor design changes intended to lower the part and fabrication costs of Lexmark Model Ms. The case and metal backplate were repeatedly lightened. The cable jack and detachable SDL cable were replaced with a fixed cable. Some variants were made with a single color for key legends.

In 1995 Lexmark made the most sweeping design change in the Model M's history, altering the size and location of the internal controller board. While the new "press-fit" design successfully lowered manufacturing costs by eliminating the two ribbon cables and separate LED daughterboard of older versions, the controller's new card-edge connector proved to be a failure point that shortened the keyboard's average lifetime. The classic era of the Model M is generally considered to have ended with this change, though a few on the older pattern continued to be made at Greenock and Guadalajara until 1999. Relatively few press-fit model Ms have survived.

During the Lexmark years, a few Model M variants were manufactured with rubber-dome key switches rather than buckling springs. Due to these switches' comparatively short durability, few of these variants have survived. Despite their rarity, today's enthusiasts and collectors do not value them nearly as highly as the more common buckling-spring variants.

A five-year agreement obligating IBM to purchase nearly all of its keyboards from Lexmark expired on March 27, 1996. Lexmark exited the keyboard business, selling related assets to IBM and Maxi Switch. When Lexmark discontinued keyboard production in April 1996, IBM continued producing buckling-spring Model M's in Scotland until 1999. Maxi Switch purchased assets for rubber-dome keyboards and the Lexmark Select-Ease Keyboard (model M15), including a buckling-spring switch patent. They continued to manufacture the IBM Enhanced Keyboard with TrackPoint II (model M13) in Mexico until 1998.

Some of Lexmark's keyboard manufacturing assets were also sold to a group of Lexmark employees, who formed Unicomp whose basic version of the Model M was similar to part number 42H1292, first renamed 42H1292U and later the Customizer. There have been other configurations, including updated 104- and 105-key layouts; a Unix layout (where the Ctrl, Caps Lock, Esc, and tilde keys are transposed); models with integrated pointing sticks and trackballs; and POS-specific models such as those with built-in magstripe readers. All used the press-fit controller characteristic of late Lexmarks.

Unicomp continued to use the original IBM machinery to produce Model Ms, leading to a gradual decline in quality as the tooling became worn. This, and various problems with their USB controllers helped keep a market for vintage Model Ms thriving. In 2020 Unicomp replaced its tooling and shipped a "New Model M" with noticeably improved build quality that more closely resembles the classic 1391401 (though with a 104- or 103-key layout and USB); many older variants are no longer sold on Unicomp's website and some still on sale have been deprecated.

== Variations ==
The Model M's numerous variations (referred to as "part numbers") incorporated alternative features and/or colors. One of the more sought after variants of the Model M keyboard is the Space Saving Keyboard, which integrates the number pad into the keyboard's main section, substantially reducing its width. The Space Saving Keyboard is likely the origin of the keyboard layout that is generally known as a "Tenkeyless keyboard."

IBM released the standard and Space Saving Model M's in an alternative 'gray/pebble' color for use with their Industrial computers, designed to conceal discoloration from handling in production environments. Other variable features include a grounded spacebar and, on some later models, drainage holes to deter damage from spilled liquids.

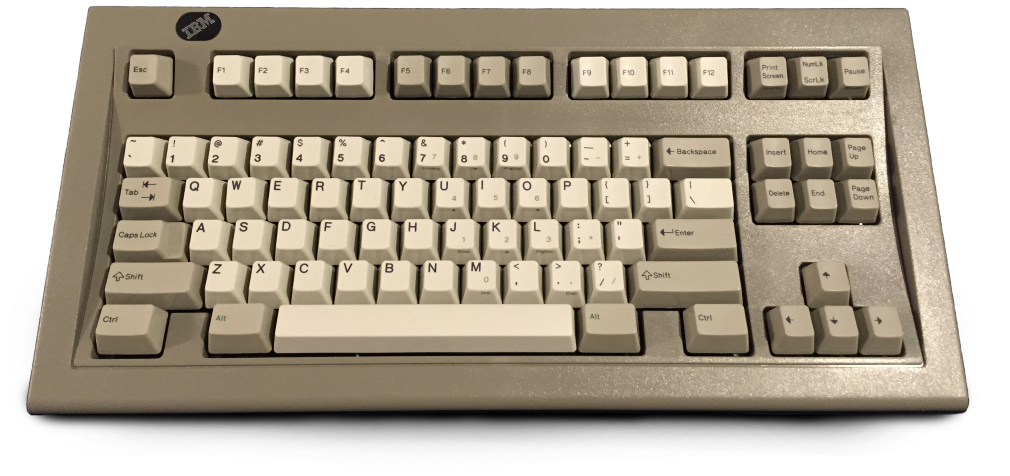
IBM model M Space Saving keyboard Industrial variant

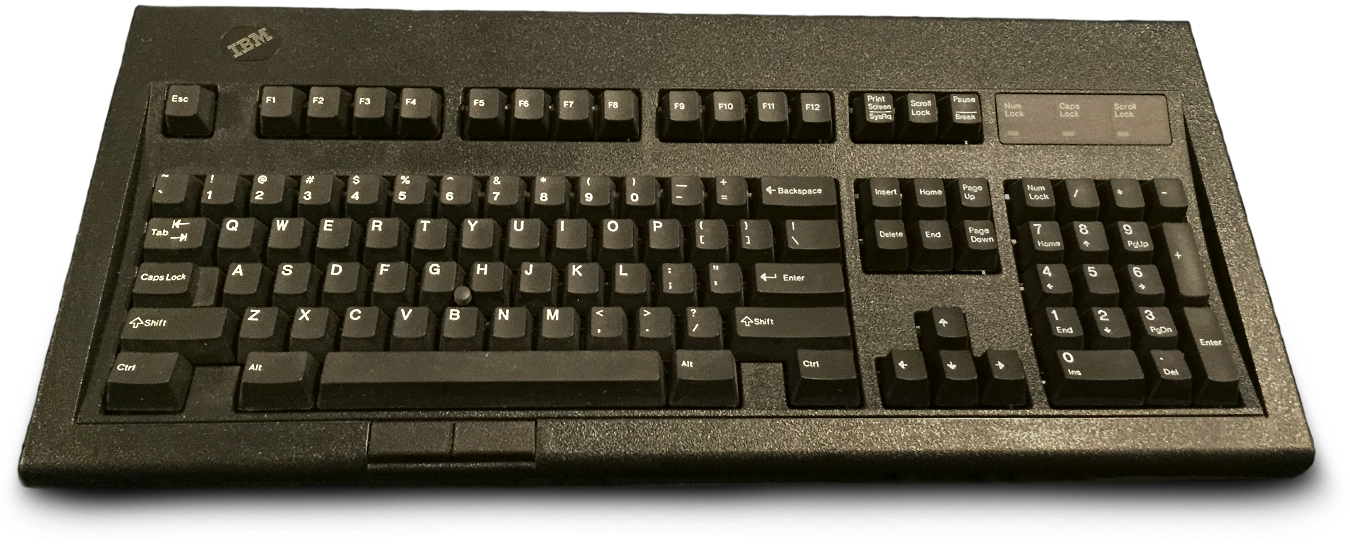
IBM Model M13 'black' variant featuring the optional black trackpoint cap
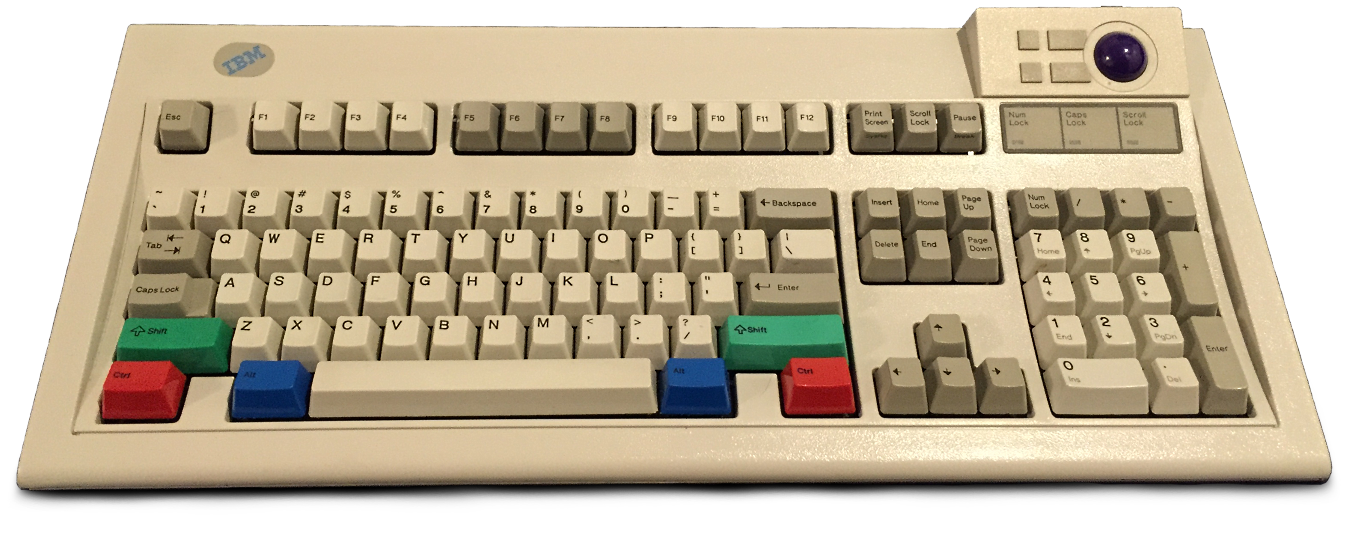
IBM Model M5-2, featuring a purple trackball and alternative 'RGB' keys from Unicomp

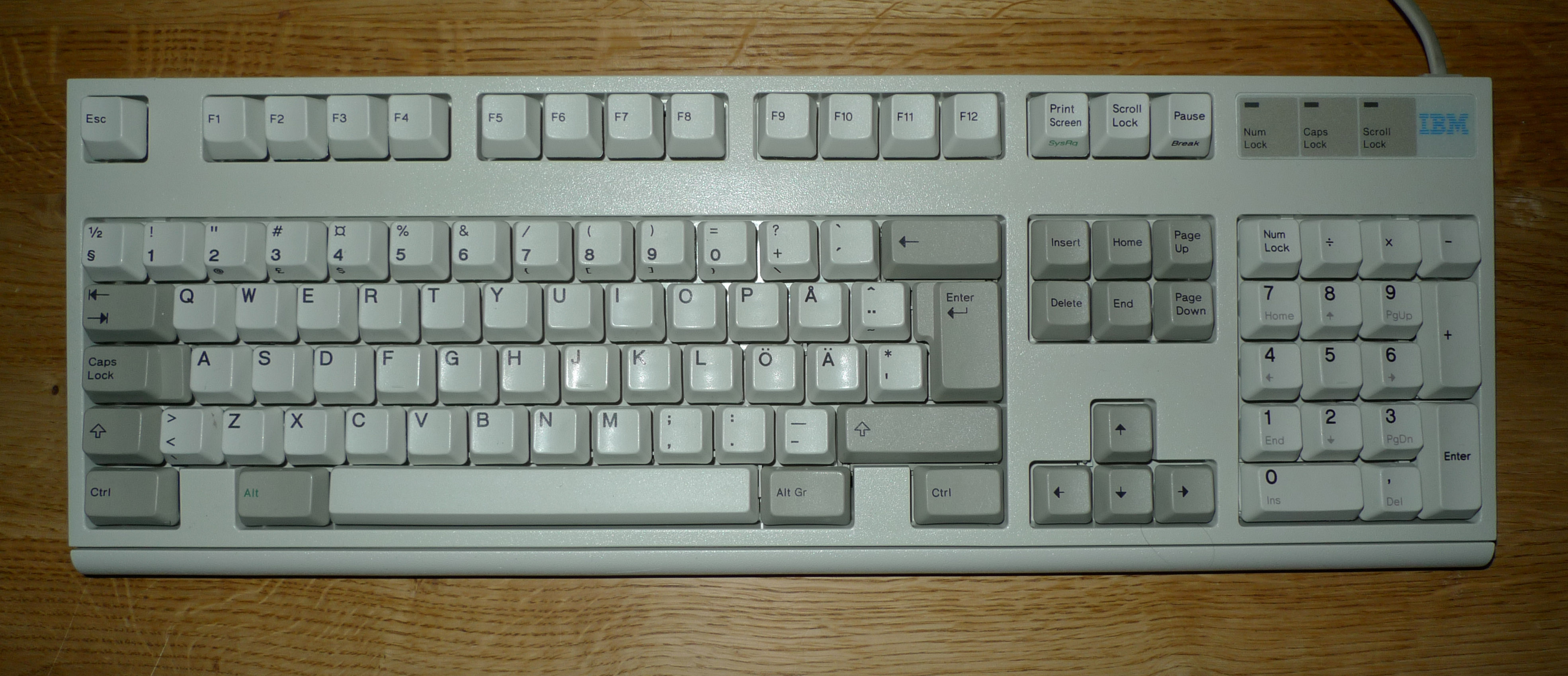
IBM Model M2, Part no. 1395713, manufactured 1992

The M2 was a late Lexmark variation issued under cost pressure from competing rubber-dome keyboards. Some revisions used rubber-dome switches; others retained buckling springs. All had a much thinner, lighter case and discarded the metal backplate. It can easily be distinguished from the original Model M design by its flat, unsculpted front case section; also the manufacturing label, if present, says "M2" rather than "M." M2s were poorly fabricated and notoriously unreliable; comparatively few survived into the 21st century, and Model M enthusiasts do not value them.

The M2 should in turn be distinguished from the M5, another Lexmark variant which returned to the rugged Model M case/backplate construction but added a built-in trackball; and those two from the M13, which was also built like rugged Model Ms but featured a pointing stick. The M5 and M13 designs are still carried by Unicomp in 2021 under the names Trackball Classic and Endura Pro.

== Design ==
The variant most commonly referred to as "Model M" is Part No. 1391401, on which many other variants were based. This model, known as the Enhanced Keyboard, included IBM's patented buckling spring design and swappable keycaps.

The Model M's design has been widely described as reliable, and the design has not changed significantly over time. Thanks to the M's design, including its heavy steel backplate and strong plastic frame, many early Model M Keyboards are still functional four decades past release.

The Model M's buckling spring key design specification gives it a unique feel and sound. Unlike more common and lower-end rubber dome designs, buckling springs give users a notable tactile and auditory feedback. Because of its more defined touch, some users report they can type faster and more accurately on the Model M than on other keyboards. Additionally, many model M enthusiasts believe that tactile-feedback keyboards like the Model M reduce stress on the hands, preventing or even reversing repetitive strain injury. Significant pressure is required to press the keys, and a pronounced sound results to help typists previously trained on typewriters who had become accustomed to that level of feedback. This resulted in the Model M sometimes being referred to as the "clicky keyboard."

Until the late fourth-generation variants, most Model Ms were manufactured with a 1.25" slotted, circular speaker grille in their bottom surfaces. Relatively few contain an actual speaker, however, which was useful only for sounding beep codes on older terminal systems. The most common P/Ns with speakers are 1394540 and 51G872, made for RS/6000 UNIX workstations.

Model Ms have been manufactured to quite a number of different interface and connector standards, some of which (such as the 5-pin DIN used on 5250 terminals) are poorly documented and have had to be reverse-engineered by enthusiasts. Early variants shipped with the PC XT and AT used connectors specific to those systems. After the introduction of the PS/2 most shipped with a connector for a PS/2 port; these included the 1391401. Unicomp introduced support for USB.

Older model Ms used a detachable cable utilizing SDL. Later Lexmark and Unicomp variants used a fixed cable.

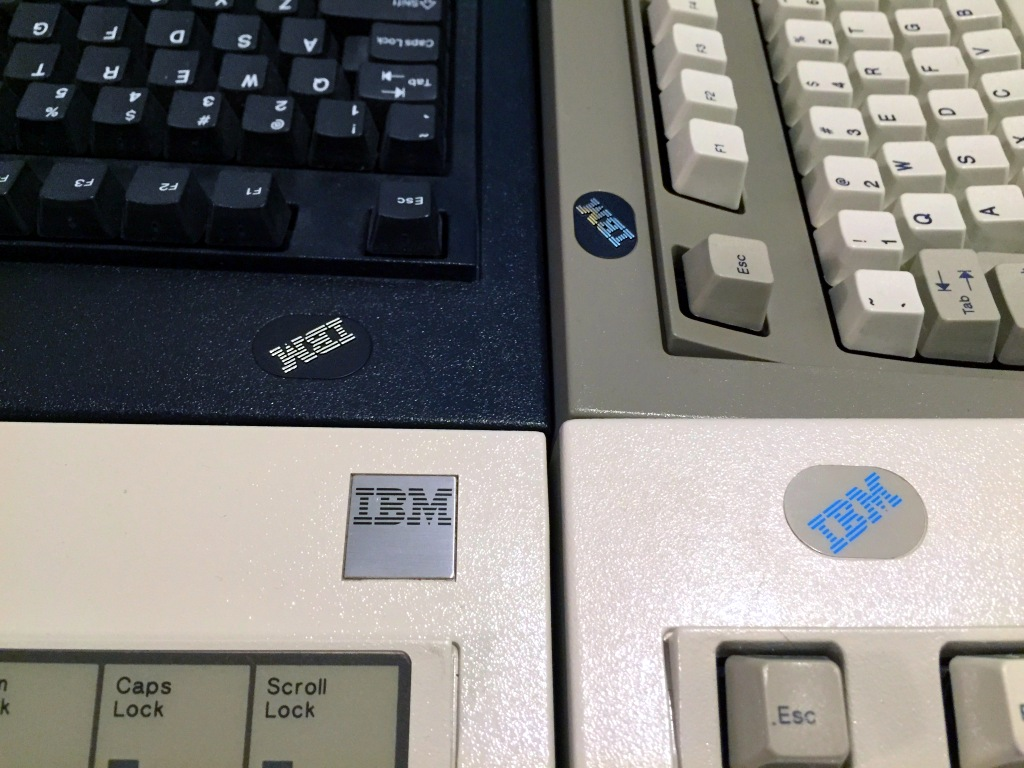
The square aluminium badge on a 1390131 series keyboard compared to other variants

== Features by part number ==
Layout types:

- 84 – Tenkeyless version of the 101-key ANSI layout.
- 87 – Tenkeyless version of the 104-key ANSI layout.
- 101 – ANSI layout, the model M's original.
- 102 – International layout with additional key between Z and a half-sized left shift, AltGr in place of right Alt, usually with ISO-style long Enter.
- 103 – ANSI layout with one Super key and one Menu key, long spacebar.
- 104 – ANSI layout plus two Windows keys and one Menu key, short spacebar.
- 122 – IBM terminal layout with extra function keys and left-side function pad.

Logo position legend:

- LC – Left Corner
- RC – Right Corner
- LLC – Lower Left Corner
- LRC – Lower Right Corner
- ULC – Upper Left Corner
- URC – Upper Right Corner
- LLP – Lock-Light Panel

Part number	Switch type	Layout	Detachable keycaps	Detachable cable	Interface	Drainage channels	Logo type, position	Maker	Years	Copyright	Features
"5152"	Buckling spring	101/102?	Yes	Yes	DIN-5	No	Square metal, black on silver, URC	IBM UK	1985-?	1985 IBM Corp.	Looks like a very early UK-made German Model-M with no lock light panel. Is marked as "Model No. 1562" and "Auxiliary Power to 5151". Label isn't like the standard label, it is vertical and grey-coloured. Cable is the thick shiny black type.
A218331	Buckling spring?	122	Yes?	No	DIN-5	Yes	Decision Data logo URC	Unicomp	?-1997-?	None	Standard 122-key Model M made by Unicomp, only noticeable difference other than the Decision Data logo being "ALICE" written in red on the top right key of the numpad which was usually either blank or marked "Space" on M122's. Images: https://imgur.com/a/qWYeeFx
ACP0412	Rubber dome	101	Yes	No	PS/2	Yes	"AFFIRMATIVE" logo URC LLP	Unicomp	?-2000-2008-?	None, Made in USA	101-key Model M with "AFFIRMATIVE" branding on the LLP. A 2000 model has the LLP labels in the older 1996-1999 layout while a 2006 model has the LLP labels in the typical Unicomp style. Enter dual marked with "Field Exit" and some other non-standard legends. Images: https://imgur.com/a/Px8yWPv
02K3672	Buckling spring	101	Yes	Yes	PS/2	Yes	Blue on oval, ULC	Unicomp	?-1998-?	None ("Mfg by Unicomp Inc for IBM")	Unicomp-made IBM keyboard, Dark gray Industrial color, has speaker grille and two tone legend on Alt Keys and Num pad.
02K3760	Buckling spring	?	Yes	No	PS/2	Yes	None (blank rectangle, ULC)	Unicomp	?-2005-?	None ("Mfg by Unicomp Inc for IBM")	Unicomp-made IBM keyboard
02K3817	Buckling spring	102?	Yes	No	PS/2	Yes	None (blank rectangle, ULC)	Unicomp	?	Unicomp, Inc. 1984	German QWERTZ layout
06H3048	Buckling spring?	101	No?	No	PS/2	Yes	"Multiview Workstation" branding text ULC	Lexmark	?-1994-?	Lexmark Int'l Inc. 1984	Standart 101-key ANSI Model M but with "Muttiview Workstation" branding and 5 additional symbols above some of the function keys. It's not entirely clear if this is an overlay type of sticker or if it was made by Lexmark like this. Images: https://imgur.com/a/rWoCf74
06H4173	Buckling spring	101?	No	No	PS/2	Yes	Silver on black oval, ULC (Maxi Switch); Blue on white oval, ULC (Unicomp)	Maxi Switch, Unicomp	1997–99	Unicomp, Inc. 1984, or none (Maxi Switch)	Dark gray Industrial PS/2 trackpoint w/two connectors for keyboard and mouse (Unicomp pointing device instead of IBM Trackpoint II)
0985705	Buckling spring	122	No	No	5250; Terminal DIN-5	No	Square metal, black on silver, URC	IBM UK	1985-?	Copyright IBM Corporation, 1985	5250 terminal with English and Arabic legends, mfred by IBM UK
0989703	Buckling spring	102	Yes	Yes	DIN-5	No	Square metal, black on silver, URC	IBM UK	1986-?	Copyright IBM Corporation 1984	English and Arabic legends, no lock lights.
0989705	Buckling spring	102	Yes?	Yes	DIN-5	No	Square metal, black on silver, URC	IBM UK	1986-?	Copyright IBM Corporation	English and Arabic legends, no lock lights.
09F4230	Blue Switches	122	No	No	RJ45	No	Square metal, black on silver, URC	IBM?	?-1989-1991-?	None, just P/N and Date and IBM logo	Space-saving Model M-122. Likely a clone due to the blue switches. Body also isn't sculpted like other Model M's. A terminal SSK version of this also exists.
1369050	Buckling spring	101	No	No	PS/2	Yes	Gray DELL logo (new style), ULC	Lexmark "Made in the USA"	?-1994-95-?	Lexmark Int'l, Inc. 1984	Standard ANSI layout with Dell logo and with lighter coloured navigation legends on numpad.
1369167	Buckling spring	102	Yes	No	AT	Yes	Client logo ("CompuAdd" observed)	Lexmark "Made in the USA"	?-1993-?	Lexmark International, Inc. 1984	Arabic & English legends
1369907	Buckling spring	101	Yes?	Yes	PS/2	Yes	Gray DELL logo (new style), ULC	Lexmark "Made in the USA"	?-1995-?	Lexmark Int'l, Inc. 1984	Dell-branded Model M5-2.
1369986	Buckling spring	122	Yes?	Yes	PS/2?	Yes	Lexmark logo, ULC	Lexmark "Made in the USA"	?-1995-?	Lexmark International, Inc. 1984	Lexmark-branded 122 key Type IV Terminal Emulator keyboard. Has a lock light panel and some legends marked in blue. Photo: https://imgur.com/B6aQBaq
1370475	Buckling spring	84	Yes	Yes	PS/2	Yes	Blue on oval, ULC	Lexmark	1993-?	Lexmark International, Inc. 1984	Space Saving Keyboard (no numeric keypad or LLP)
1370477	Buckling spring	101	No	Yes	PS/2	Yes	Blue on oval, ULC	Lexmark	1993–96	Lexmark International, Inc. 1984	A March 1996 Lexmark-made model with this part number exists with the older grey badge.
1370478	Buckling spring	101	Yes	Yes	PS/2	Yes	Blue on oval, ULC	Lexmark	1993	Lexmark Int'l. Inc. 1984	Model M5-1 w/miniature trackball and L/R "click" and "drag" buttons btw. navigation keys
1378160 1378162	Buckling spring	101	Yes	No	PS/2	Yes	[var. 1] AMBRA logo on raised trapezoid, ULC [var. 2] None	Lexmark	1993–94	Lexmark Int'l, Inc. 1984	Same p/n's used for two sub-variants: (1.) IBM AMBRA budget home PCs (2.) Logoless OEM boards
1378186	Rubber dome	101	No	No	PS/2	Yes	Lexmark logo, ULC	Lexmark	?-1994-?	Lexmark International, Inc. 1985	Only known rubber-dome Model M sold under Lexmark's name
1378192	Buckling spring	101	Yes	No	PS/2	Yes	Lexmark logo, ULC	Lexmark	?-1994-?	Lexmark Int'l. Inc. 1984	White Model M13 with Trackpoint II
1378207	Buckling spring?	101?	Yes ?	No	DIN-5	Yes	Lexmark(ULC)	Lexmark for IBM	?-1994-1995-?	Lexmark International, Inc. 1984	Came with DIN to PS/2 converter. Some model's say "...for IBM" on the back despite having a Lexmark logo on the front.
1378210	Buckling spring	101	Yes	Yes	PS/2	Yes	None (blank oval, ULC)	Lexmark	?-1995-?	Lexmark Int'l. Inc. 1984	Model M5-2 w/trackball, L/R "click" and "drag" buttons above LLP
1379590	Buckling spring?	74	No	Yes	PS/2	Yes	Grey on oval, ULC	Lexmark	?-1994-?	Lexmark Int'l. Inc. 1984	Model M4-1 with trackpoint and left and right mouse buttons.
1386303	Buckling spring	102	No	No	Terminal DIN-5	No	Square metal, black on silver, URC	IBM	1985-1987-?	IBM Corp. 1984	102-key 3161 terminal keyboard; no lock lights (locks indicated on terminal screen)
1386304	Buckling spring	101/102?	Yes	Yes (no on 1989 model)	DIN-5	No	Square metal, black on silver, URC	IBM, Lexmark	?-1985-1994?	IBM Corp. 1984 / Lexmark Int'l. Inc. 1984	No lock lights and has short coiled cable with right angled DIN connector. On some models R-Ctrl is marked as "Enter" and L-Alt marked as "Reset". A Lexmark-made 1994 model exists with square metal IBM badge un URC, with non-detachable DIN-5 plug.
1386716	Buckling spring	102	Yes	Yes	AT or PS/2	No	Square metal, black on silver, URC or Gray on oval, ULC	IBM UK	?-1986-87-?	IBM Corp. 1986; IBM Corp. 1987	German QWERTZ layout
1386887	Buckling spring	122	Yes	No	Terminal DIN-5	No	Black on square silver metal, URC	IBM	?-1986-?	IBM Corp. 1985	122-key 3179 terminal keyboard
1388032	Buckling spring	101	Yes	Yes	AT	No	Silver on square black metal, URC	IBM	1985, 1986	IBM Corp. 1984	Dark grey industrial version
1388081	Buckling spring	101	Yes?	Yes	?	No	Black on square silver metal, URC	IBM	1985-?	IBM Corp. 1984	Dark grey industrial version, IBM factory customised of part number 1388032.
1389160	Buckling spring	122	Yes	No	Terminal DIN-5	No	Black on square silver metal, URC	IBM	?-1986-?	IBM Corp. 1985	122-key terminal Model M with contoured Reset, Alt and Enter keys on the bottom row. Function keys marked as "PF"
1389194	Buckling spring	122	Yes	No	Terminal DIN-5	No	Black on square silver metal, URC	IBM	?-1986-?	IBM Corp. 1984	122-key 3179/3192 terminal keyboard with APL keycaps
1389262	Buckling spring	122	Yes	No	Terminal DIN-5	No	Black on square silver metal, URC	IBM (label also says "Product of CEL TECH", 1986 model does not)	1986-1989-?	IBM Corp. 1894 or 1985	122-key 3180 model 210 5250 terminal keyboard with data entry layout keycaps
1389969	Buckling spring	102?	Yes	Yes	XT, AT	No	Black on square silver metal, URC	IBM UK	1986	IBM Corp. 1984	UK layout; no lock lights
1389979	Buckling spring	102?	Yes	Yes	AT	No	Black on square silver metal, URC	IBM	1986–87	IBM Corp. 1984	Swedish layout; no lock lights
1390110	Buckling spring	101	Yes	Yes	AT	No	General Electric logo, upper right	IBM	1985-?	IBM Corp. 1984	Black case (standard pearl keys)
1390120	Buckling spring	101	Yes	Yes	XT, AT, PS/2	No	Black on square silver metal, URC	IBM	1986–87	IBM Corp. 1984	No lock lights
1390123	Buckling spring	101	Yes	No	DIN-5	No	Black on square silver metal, URC	IBM	1986-1988?	IBM Corp. 1985	101-key Model M with no Lock Lights. Most keys also have non-standard legends such as Esc which says "SetUp, Attn, ExSel", L-Ctrl says "Reset/Ctrl" and "Quit", R-Ctrl says "Enter", Print Screen says "Ident, Print, SysRq", along with different legends on the nav cluster and numpad. Function keys are also dual marked F13 - F24 with some keys having a third legend on the front of the key.
1390131	Buckling spring	101	Yes	Yes	AT or PS/2	No	Black on square silver metal, URC	IBM	1985–88, 1991–93	IBM Corp. 1984	A 1991 model has the older square metal badge in the URC.
1390132	Buckling spring	102?	Yes	Yes	AT or PS/2	No	Black on square silver metal, URC	IBM	1986-?	IBM Corp. 1986	French AZERTY layout
1390133	Buckling spring	102?	Yes	Yes	AT or PS/2	No	Black on square silver metal, URC	IBM	?-1986-87	IBM Corp. 1984	German QWERTZ layout
1390136	Buckling spring	101?	Yes	Yes	AT or PS/2	No	Black on square silver metal, URC	IBM	?-1986-87	IBM Corp. 1984	UK layout
1390137	Buckling spring	101?	Yes	Yes	PS/2	No	Black on square silver metal, URC	IBM	?-1987-?	IBM Corp. 1984	UK layout
1390146	Buckling spring	102	Yes?	Yes	PS/2	No	Black on square silver metal, URC	IBM UK	?-1986-?	IBM Corporation	French AZERTY layout with no lock lights
1390148	Buckling spring	102?	Yes	Yes	XT	No	Black on square silver metal, URC	IBM	?-1986-87	IBM Corp. 1984	German QWERTZ layout; no lock lights
1390150	Buckling spring	102	Yes	Yes	DIN-5	No	Black on square silver metal, URC	IBM	?-1986-?	IBM Corporation	Italian layout; no lock lights
1390238	Buckling spring	122	Yes	No	5250 Terminal DIN-5	No	Black on square silver metal, URC	IBM	?-1989-?	IBM Corp. 1984	3270-layout terminal data entry keyboard, no lock lights. Unusual for an M122 in not having an aperture for an SDL jack in the case, just an exit hole for the fixed cable.
1390572	Buckling spring	122	Yes	No	Terminal DIN-5	No	Black on square silver metal, URC	IBM	1986-1987?	IBM Corp. 1985	122-key terminal keyboard
1390636	Buckling spring	101	Yes?	No	RJ45 or DIN5	No	Grey on oval, ULC or Black on square silver metal, URC	IBM	?-1987-1989?	IBM Corp. 1985	101-key Model M with no Lock Lights. Most keys also have non-standard legends such as Esc which says "SetUp, Attn, ExSel", L-Ctrl says "Reset/Ctrl" and "Quit", R-Ctrl says "Enter", Print Screen says "Ident, Print, SysRq", along with different legends on the nav cluster and numpad. Function keys are also dual marked F13 - F24 with some keys having a third legend on the front of the key.
1390639	Buckling spring	102?	Yes	No	XT	Yes	Black on square silver metal, URC	IBM	?-1987-?	IBM Corp. 1985	Spanish QWERTY layout
1390653	Buckling spring	101	Yes	Yes	AT or PS/2	No	Silver on square black metal, URC	IBM	1987–1988	IBM Corp. 1985	Dark gray Industrial version
1390670	Buckling spring	122?	Yes	No	Terminal DIN-5	No	Black on square silver metal, URC	IBM	1987	IBM Corp. 1985	Terminal keyboard that shipped with the IBM 3162
1390702	Buckling spring	122	Yes	No	Terminal DIN-5	No	Gray on square silver metal, URC	IBM	?-1987-1989-?	IBM Corp. 1985	Standard 122-key terminal layout, Function keys marked as "Cmd" or "PF" 1 - 24
1390712	Buckling spring	122	Yes	No	Terminal DIN-5	No	Black on square silver metal, URC	IBM	?-1987-?	IBM Corporation 1985	Standard 122-key terminal layout, Function keys marked as "PF" 1 - 24
1390876	Buckling spring?	122	Yes	No	Terminal DIN-5	No	Gray on square silver metal, URC	IBM, Lexmark	1987-1995-?	IBM Corp. 1985, Lexmark International 19??	Standard 122-key terminal layout, Function keys marked as "Cmd" 1 - 24
1390877	Buckling spring	122	Yes?	No	Terminal DIN-5	No	Gray on square silver metal, URC	IBM	?-1989-?	IBM Corp. 1985	French 122-key terminal Model M with keys such as R-Ctrl marked as "Entrée" and Enter/Field Exit marked as "ZSuiv".
1390951	Buckling spring	102	Yes?	No	Terminal DIN-5	No	Gray on square silver metal, URC	IBM UK	?-1986-?	IBM Corp. 1985	Danish/Finnish/Swedish? 102-key terminal Model M with keys such as R-Ctrl marked as "Reset/Quit" and Enter marked as "Field Exit", Function keys dual marked F12-F24 and terminal-like nav cluster and numpad. No Lock light panel.
1391240	Buckling spring (?)	?	Yes	Yes	PS/2	Yes	Black on square silver metal, URC, w/small T in LRC (for "Terminal"?)	IBM	1987-?	IBM Corp. 1984	Esc key says Esc Reset
1391401	Buckling spring	101	Yes	Yes	AT or PS/2	No (yes 1992+)	Grey (blue 1992+) on oval, ULC	IBM, IBM de Mexico	1986–96	IBM Corp. 1984	Standard variant on which most 2nd-generation Model M's are based
1391402	Buckling spring	102?	Yes	Yes	PS/2	No later yes?	Grey (blue 1992?+) on oval, ULC	IBM UK	1989-96-?	IBM Corp. 1985	French AZERTY layout
1391403	Buckling spring	102?	Yes	Yes (no 1994 and later)	AT or PS/2	Yes (no UK pre-1992)	Gray or blue on oval, ULC	IBM UK, Lexmark International	1986–97	IBM Corp./Lexmark International Inc. 1985	German QWERTZ layout
1391404	Buckling spring	102	Yes	Yes	AT or PS/2	No (later yes)	Gray on oval, ULC	IBM UK	1986-1997-?	IBM Corporation 1985	Italian QWERTY layout
1391405	Buckling spring	102?	Yes	Yes	AT or PS/2	No (yes 1996+)	Gray or blue on oval, ULC	IBM UK	1986-1994-?	IBM Corp. 1985, Lexmark International Inc. 1985	Spanish QWERTY layout
1391406	Buckling spring	102	Yes	Yes (later no)	AT or PS/2	No (later yes)	Gray or blue on oval, ULC	IBM UK	=1985–1999	IBM United Kingdom	UK 102-key
1391407	Buckling spring	102	Yes	Yes	PS/2	Yes	Gray or blue on oval, ULC	IBM UK	?91-94-95-96-?	IBM United Kingdom	Danish/Icelandic 102-key
1391408	Buckling spring	101	Yes	Yes	PS/2	Yes	Blue on oval, ULC	IBM	?-1993-?	IBM Corp. 1985	Hebrew 101-key
1391409	Buckling spring	102	Yes	Yes	PS/2	No	Gray or blue on oval, ULC	IBM	1987?-94?	IBM Corp. 1985/Lexmark Int. 1985	Norwegian 102-key
1391410	Buckling spring	102	Yes	Yes	PS/2	No	Gray or blue on oval, ULC	IBM UK	1989?-1994-?	IBM Corp. 1985	Portuguese 102-key
1391411	Buckling spring	102	Yes	Yes	AT or PS/2	No	Gray or blue on oval, ULC	IBM UK	?-1987-97-?	IBM Corp. 1985	Swedish 102-key
1391412	Buckling spring	102	Yes	Yes	PS/2	No	Gray on oval, ULC	IBM UK	1987–96	IBM Corp.	Swiss French/German QWERTZ layout, 102-key
1391413	Buckling spring	102	Yes	Yes	PS/2	No	Gray on oval, ULC	IBM de Mexico	?-1987-1989-?	IBM Corp. 1984	Spanish 102-key
1391414	Buckling spring	102	Yes	Yes	PS/2	Yes	Gray or blue on oval, ULC	IBM UK	?-1996-?	IBM Corp. 1985	Belgian AZERTY layout
1391472	Buckling spring	84	Yes	Yes	AT or PS/2	No	Gray on oval, ULC	IBM	1987–91	IBM Corp. 1984	Space Saving Keyboard, no numeric keypad or LLP.
1391490	Buckling spring	102	Yes	Yes	PS/2	No	Gray or blue on oval, ULC	IBM UK	?-1988-1994-?	IBM Corporation 1985	Arabic layout
1391506	Buckling spring	102	Yes	Yes	PS/2	No (yes 1995+)	Gray or blue on oval, ULC	IBM de Mexico; Lexmark	1990 - IBM de Mexico ?-1996 - Lexmark	IBM Corp. 1984 or Lexmark International, Inc. 1984	Spanish QWERTY layout. A 1996 Lexmark model exists with a detachable cable and the old style LLP as well as having a purple PS/2 head at the end of the cable despite predating the PC-97 standard. Image: https://imgur.com/SY82BWD
1391511	Buckling spring	102	Yes	Yes	PS/2	No (later Yes)	Blue or Gray on oval, ULC	IBM UK	1987–93	IBM Corp. 1985	Dutch 102-key
1391580	Buckling spring	?	Yes	Yes	PS/2	No	Gray on oval, ULC	IBM	1987–88	IBM Corp. 1984	For PC-based IBM 3270 emulation (secondary terminal legends)
1392090	Buckling spring?	101?	Yes ?	Yes	PS/2	No	Gray on oval, ULC	IBM	?-1992?-?	Country of Origin USA	Cable attachment looks slightly different than usual. Doesn't have normal back label, could be a fake.
1392366	Buckling spring	?	Yes	No	6-pin AMP (terminal)	No	Square metal, black on silver, URC	IBM	1986–89	IBM Corp. 1985	For PC RT 6150 UNIX workstation, w/internal speaker for system "beeps". R Ctrl key says Action; number-pad "Enter" includes arrow.
1392464	Buckling spring	84	Yes	Yes	PS/2	No	Gray on oval, ULC	IBM	1987	IBM Corp. 1984	Space Saving Keyboard (no numeric keypad or LLP) with special legends for IBM Displaywriter system, stepped modifier caps
1392597	Buckling spring	101	?	No	8P5C (RJ-45)	No	Gray on oval, ULC	IBM	?-1989-?	IBM Corp. 1984	French-Canadian terminal keyboard
1392934	Buckling spring	84	Yes	Yes	PS/2	No	Gray on oval, ULC	IBM	1992	IBM Corp. 1984	Space Saving Keyboard (no numeric keypad or LLP)
1392565	Buckling spring	122?	Yes	No	8P5C (RJ-45)	Yes	Gray on oval, ULC	Lexmark (for IBM)	?-1995	Lexmark International, Inc. 1984	Keyboard for terminals such as IBM 3151; graphics characters on numeric keypad; Page Up/Page Down replaced with Clear/Erase EOF; bottom row: Ctrl, Reset, [spacebar], Ctrl, Send
1392595	Buckling spring?	101	Yes	No	RJ45	No (later Yes)	Gray or Blue on oval ULC or Square metal, black on silver, URC	IBM / Lexmark for IBM / Unicomp for IBM	?-1987-2001-?	IBM Corp. 1984	101-key terminal layout with "Reset/Cancel" key instead of L-Ctrl and other key differences. Also no lock light indicators. A 1991 model exists with the older square IBM badge. A 2001 model exists made by Unicomp with a blue IBM logo on the LLP.
1392934	Buckling spring	84	Yes	Yes	AT or PS/2	No	Gray or blue on oval, ULC	IBM	?-1987-92-?	IBM Corp. 1984	Space Saving Keyboard (no numeric keypad or LLP)
1392980	Buckling spring	84	Yes	Yes	8P5C (RJ-45)	No	Gray on oval, ULC	IBM	1987-?	IBM Corp. 1984	This PN has been reported on two different variants, both 84-key SSKs. One was a terminal version with no LLP; extra front-printed legends on F-keys, nav. keys. The other had PC keycaps and LLP and spoke PS/2.
1393387	Buckling spring	?	Yes	Yes	PS/2	No	Gray or blue on oval, ULC or URC	IBM	?-1989 – 1995?	IBM Corporation 1985	18-key keypad for IBM Screen Reader/DOS voice-output application. 1989 model includes two drainage channels.
1393395	Buckling spring	102	Yes	Yes (later no)	PS/2	No (later yes)	Gray or Blue on oval, ULC	IBM UK	1985-1995-?	IBM Corporation 1985	Italian QWERTY layout
1393464	Buckling spring	101	Yes	Yes	PS/2	No{?}	Gray on oval, ULC; some have red Sabre logo instead	IBM	?-1988-92-?	IBM Corp. 1984	Special secondary legends for Sabre airline reservation system
1393669	Buckling spring	102	Yes (no after ????)	Yes (1994+)	AT or PS/2	Yes (1995+)	Gray or blue on oval, ULC; or blue below LLP	Lexmark UK, IBM UK / Unicomp	198?-200?	Lexmark International Inc. 1985 / IBM Corp. 1985 / Unicomp 1996	Slovenian/Croatian (former YU) QWERTZ layout; with or without speaker grille
1393691	Buckling spring	84	Yes	Yes	AT or PS/2	No	Gray on oval, ULC	IBM	?-1988-?	IBM Corp. 1984	Space Saving Keyboard (no numeric keypad or LLP) version of 1393464 (Sabre airline reservation variant)
1393705	Buckling spring	101	Yes	No	RJ45	No	Gray on oval, ULC	IBM	?-1988-1991-?	IBM Corp. 1984	Terminal Model M with no LLP and different key legends such as "Attn" on Esc, "Reset" and "Enter" on Left and Right Ctrl, no navigation legends on the numpad and dual marked F13 - F24 on the function keys.
1393915	Buckling spring?	?	Yes	Yes	PS/2 (or AT?)	Yes	Gray on oval, ULC	IBM	?-1988-?	IBM Corp. 1984	49-key layout
1394064	Buckling spring	101	Yes	Yes	PS/2	No	Gray (IBM-made) or blue (Lexmark-made) on oval, ULC	IBM, Lexmark	?-1989-90-? (IBM) ?-1996-? (Lexmark)	IBM Corp. 1984; Lexmark International, Inc. 1984	Some front-printed secondary legends in red and green; Esc key says Escpe; red-printed Ctrl keys
1394099	Buckling spring	122	Yes	No	RJ45	No	Gray or blue on oval, ULC	IBM UK	?-1989-1998-? (IBM UK)	IBM Corporation 1985	122-key terminal emulation keyboard: Polish layout, no lock lights, Home/Rule key with arrow keys in a "plus" layout; 24 function keys; 10-key left cluster with terminal commands (Attn, Clear, Pause, ErEOF, etc.)
1394100	Buckling spring	122	Yes	No	RJ45	No	Gray on oval, ULC	IBM	?-1990-1992-?	IBM Corp. 1985	122-key terminal keyboard
1394124	Buckling spring	122	Yes	No	RJ45	Yes	Blue on oval - ULC, or IBM Logo on LLP (Unicomp)	IBM UK, Unicomp	?-1997-2004-?	Made in United Kingdom by IBM UK Limited / None on Unicomp models	122-key Arabic terminal keyboard. Unicomp models exist with this P/N made for IBM as late as November 2004.
1394177, 1394167	Buckling spring	122	Yes	No	RJ45	No	Gray or Blue on oval, ULC; or plain rectangle URC	IBM UK / Unicomp	1992-1998-? (IBM), ?-2001-2002-? Unicomp	IBM Corporation 1985	122-key terminal emulation keyboard: no lock lights, Arrow keys in a "plus" layout with Home/Rule key in center; 24 function keys in two rows of 12; 10-key left cluster with commands (SysRq Attn, Print, Record, Help, Play, etc.)
1394193	Buckling spring	101	Yes	No	RJ45 or PS/2	No	Blue on oval, ULC	IBM UK	?-1996-1998-?	Made in United Kingdom by IBM UK Limited	101-key terminal Model M with blanked out LLP and some different key legends. Including L-Ctrl being "Reset/Quit", Enter (ANSI) is "Field Exit", R-Ctrl is "Enter", F-keys are dual marked F13 - F24 and the numpad is in a similar style to the 122-key Model M's. Also has larger feet and a cable gutter.
1394204	Buckling spring	101 or 102 (no AltGr)	Yes	No	RJ45	Yes	Blue on oval, ULC	IBM, IBM UK	?-1993-? ?-1999 IBM UK	IBM Corp. 1985	102-key Terminal Model M with no lock light indicators and added tab key on the keypad. Function keys are dual marked up to F24 along with various other different key legends. This model has larger feet than normal Model M's and also features a two-way cable gutter- although, this does not apply to all models with this P/N. Images: https://imgur.com/a/LUQpf4H https://imgur.com/a/nldGCXD . A 1999 US-Made model of this also exists, image: https://imgur.com/a/UlyYD2W
1394308	Buckling spring	122	Yes	No	RJ45	No	Gray on oval, ULC	IBM	?-1989-?	IBM Corp 1985	Typical 122-key terminal Model M.
1394312	Buckling spring	122	Yes	No	RJ45	No	Gray on oval, ULC	IBM UK	?-1991-?	IBM Corporation 1985	German 122-key terminal Model M.
1394317	Buckling spring	122	Yes	No	RJ45	No (later yes)	Gray or blue on oval, ULC	IBM UK	?-1990-1996-?	IBM Corporation 1985	Italian 122-key terminal Model M.
1394332	Buckling spring	122	No	No	RJ45	Yes	Blue IBM Logo on lock light-style panel	Unicomp	?-2006-?	None, "Assembled in the US of US and non-US components for International Business Machines Corporation"	122-key terminal keyboard similar to IBM/Lexmark-made models except for large IBM logo on what looks like an LLP above the number pad. Keycaps in Latin and Arabic script.
1394540	Buckling spring	101	Yes	Yes	PS/2	No	Gray on oval, ULC	IBM	1990–92	IBM Corp. 1984	Made for IBM RS/6000 system, w/internal speaker for system "beeps". R Ctrl key says Ctrl/Act
1394542	Buckling spring	102	Yes	Yes	PS/2	Yes	Gray or blue on oval, ULC	IBM UK, Lexmark UK	1991-95?	IBM Corp. 1985; Lexmark International, Inc. 1985	German QWERTZ layout; made for IBM RS/6000 system, w/internal speaker for system "beeps"
1394545	Buckling spring	102	Yes	Yes	PS/2	No	Gray or blue on oval, ULC	IBM UK, Lexmark	1990-96?	IBM Corp. 1985 / Lexmark International Inc. 1985	Swedish/Finnish 102-key QWERTY layout; made for IBM RS/6000 system, w/internal speaker for system "beeps"
1394618	Buckling spring	101	Yes	Yes	PS/2	No (Lexmark yes)	Gray (IBM) or blue (Lexmark) on oval, ULC	IBM, Lexmark	1989-? (IBM); ?-1994-? (Lexmark)	IBM Corp. 1984 / Lexmark International Inc. 1985	For IBM Personal Typing System, a PS/2 Model 30 PC for word processing. Special keycaps with green secondary w.p. commands, front-printed F-keys with commands on top.
1394646	Buckling spring?	101	?	No	PS/2	Yes	Blue on oval, ULC	Lexmark	?-1995-?	Lexmark International Inc. 1985	Standard 101-key Model M with Lock Light Panel. Has additional sticker on the back stating it was assembled by IBM Corporation in Armonk, NY, partially covering the Lexmark sticker.
1394946	Buckling spring	101	Yes	Yes (no Unicomp model)	AT or PS/2	No (yes 1992+)	Silver on black oval, ULC; later models blue on gray oval	IBM, Lexmark, Unicomp	1988–96; ?-1999-? (Unicomp)	IBM Corp. 1984; Lexmark International, Inc. 1984	Most common Industrial Model M (essentially a gray 1391401). ASCII & ISO versions use same p/n.
1394950	Buckling spring	101	Yes	Yes	PS/2	Yes	Silver on black oval, ULC	IBM UK	?-1997-?	Made in UK by IBM UK Ltd.	ANSI Industrial model. 1997 model still has the speaker grill on the back and has a black connection at the end of undetachable cable. Image of back: https://imgur.com/a/adlti8R
1394957	Buckling spring	102	Yes	Yes	PS/2	Yes	Blue on oval, ULC	IBM UK	1985-?	IBM Corp. 1985	Italian QWERTY, dark gray Industrial version
1394958	Buckling spring	102	Yes	Yes	PS/2	Yes	Silver on black oval, ULC	IBM UK	?-1998-?	IBM Corp. 1985	German QWERTZ, dark gray Industrial version
1394966	Buckling spring	102	Yes	Yes	PS/2	?	Silver on black oval, ULC	IBM UK	1992	IBM Corp. 1985	Swedish 102-key, dark gray Industrial version
1394421	Buckling spring	102	Yes	No	RJ45	No	Gray or Blue on gray, ULC	IBM UK	?-1990-1993-?	IBM Corporation 1985	102-key terminal keyboard with no lock lights and different legends on some keycaps. Function keys are dual marked up to F24, Enter is labelled as "Field Exit", L-Alt is "Reset" and "Quit", R-Ctrl is "Enter", Esc is "SetUp/Attn", the numpad only has numerals, along with various other non-standard keycaps legends. Italian version of this P/N also exists.
1394428	Buckling spring	102	Yes	?	RJ45	?	Blue on gray, ULC	IBM UK	?-1993-?	IBM Corporation 1985	102-key terminal keyboard with no lock lights and different legends on some keycaps. Function keys are dual marked up to F24, Enter is labelled as "Field Exit", L-Alt is "Reset" and "Quit", R-Ctrl is "Enter", Esc is "SetUp/Attn", the numpad only has numerals, along with various other keycaps legends.
1395100	Buckling spring	84	Yes	Yes	PS/2	Yes	Blue on oval, ULC (SSK); square Reply logo, URC (OEM), square Eagle Computers logo, URC	IBM, Lexmark	1991–92	IBM Corp. 1984; Lexmark International, Inc. 1984	This p/n used for: • IBM Space Saving Keyboard (no number pad or LLP) • Lexmark 101-key OEM board for Reply court reporting systems • Lexmark 101-key OEM board for Eagle Computers
1395158	Buckling spring?	101	?	No	RJ45	Yes	Blue on oval, ULC	IBM UK	?-1997-?	?	101-key Model M with various different key legends and no Lock Light Panel. All function keys are dual marked F13 - F24, Num pad only has digits and no secondary legends, Esc is marked as Attn, L-Ctrl is marked as Reset and Cancel and ESC is where Scroll Lock usually is.
1395162	Buckling spring	101	Yes	No	RJ45	No (later yes)	Grey on oval, ULC	IBM, Lexmark	?-1989-1993-?	Lexmark Int'l, Inc. 1984	Model M with no lock lights and with some different key caps. Scroll Lock is "-", End is "New Line", Num Lock is "Tab" and Numpad * is "Back Tab". Worth noting a 1993 model has the older grey IBM oval badge.
1395217	Buckling spring	84	Yes	Yes	AT or PS/2	No	Gray on oval, ULC	IBM	?-1989-?	IBM Corp. 1984	Space Saving Keyboard (no numeric keypad or LLP)
1395240	Buckling spring	101	Yes?	Yes	PS/2	No	Black "AV" oval, ULC	IBM	?-1989-?	IBM Corp. 1984	Silver text on black metal logo, Manufactured by IBM Corporation "A-B Quality"
1395249	Buckling spring	50	Yes	Yes	PS/2	No	Blue on oval, ULC	IBM / Lexmark	1990? - 1996-?	IBM Corp. 1984	IBM Model 100 Functional Keypad Emulator for emulating IBM 4700 applications on IBM Personal System/2. Model M50 with 50 keys.
1395300	Buckling spring	101	No	No	PS/2	No	Blue on square, URC	IBM / IBM UK	1990-95-?	IBM Corp. 1984 / Lexmark Int Inc. 1989	Model M2; shipped with IBM PS/1 PC
1395660	Buckling spring	122	Yes	No	RJ45	No (later yes)	Gray (Blue on oval 1992+) on oval, ULC	IBM, Lexmark, Unicomp	?-1989-1994-?; ?-2002-? (Unicomp?)	IBM Corp. 1985 / Lexmark Int'l 1985	122-key terminal keyboard with R-Ctrl being labeled "Enter" and the return/enter key labeled "Field Exit". A 2002 model exists stating "Product of I.B.M. Corp." with no mention of Unicomp, but does say "Made in USA".
1395665	Buckling spring	101	Yes	No	RJ45	Yes	Gray or Blue on oval, ULC	IBM	?-1991-1993-?	IBM Corp. 1985	101 key terminal-like Model M with larger feet and cable gutter on the back. Function keys dual marked F13 - F24. No LLP.
1395674	Buckling spring	101	Yes	Yes	PS/2	No (yes 1995)	Gray on oval, ULC	IBM, Lexmark	1991-94 (IBM); 1995 (Lexmark)	IBM Corp. 1984; Lexmark International, Inc. 1984	101-key terminal emulator (no LLP; special legends on F-keys, number pad; R Ctrl says Enter)
1395682	Buckling spring	84	Yes	Yes	PS/2	Yes	Silver on black oval, ULC	IBM	1993–1994	IBM Corp. 1984	Dark gray Industrial Space Saving Keyboard (no numeric keypad or LLP); blue keys for F1-F2, terminal paging and cursor movement. Image: https://imgur.com/a/pVwK2V3
1395706	Buckling spring	?	No	No	PS/2	No	Blue on square, URC	IBM UK	?-1993-?	IBM Corp 1989	UK Model M2
1395709	Buckling spring?	102?	No	No	PS/2	No	Blue on square, URC	IBM UK	?-1993-?	IBM Corp 1989	Dutch Model M2
1395710	Buckling spring	102?	No	No	PS/2	No	Blue on square, URC	IBM UK	?-1992-?	IBM Corp 1989	Belgian Model M2
1395712	Buckling spring	102?	No	No	PS/2	No	Blue on square, URC	IBM UK	?-1990-?	IBM Corp 1989	Italian Model M2
1395720	Buckling spring	102	No	No	PS/2	No	Blue on square, URC	IBM UK	?-1995-?	Lexmark Int Inc. 1989	Italian Model M2. Left and Right Ctrl is written as "Control" and L-Alt is in green which is unusual for a model made this late (1995).
1396790	Buckling spring	101	Yes	Yes	PS/2	Yes (no 1991)	Gray, or blue (1992+) on oval, ULC	IBM	?-1991-1995-?	IBM Corp. 1985	Made in UK by IBM; North American layout, a 1995 model exists with a fixed non-coiled cable but still attached at the older location.
1397000	Buckling spring	122	Yes	Yes	PS/2	Yes (post-1992)	Gray or Blue on oval, ULC	IBM / Lexmark (for IBM)	?-1988-1993-?	IBM Corp. 1984 / Lexmark International, Inc. 1984	122-key terminal emulation keyboard: Home/Rule key with arrow keys in a "plus" layout; 24 function keys; 10-key left cluster with terminal commands (Attn, Clear, Pause, ErEOF, etc.). Some models with this P/N exist with the lock light panel present - secondary legends are blue on the version with the LLP.
1397451	Buckling Rubber Sleeve	84	No	Yes	PS/2	Yes	Blue on oval, ULC	Lexmark (for IBM)	?-1996-?	Lexmark International, Inc. 1984	Model M4 with thick grey coiled detachable SDL-PS/2 cable. Alt keys and SysRq legends are in green like earlier Model M's.
1397711	Buckling spring	102	Yes	Yes	PS/2	Yes	Dell logo ULC	Lexmark	?-1994-?	Lexmark International, Inc. 1984	Arabic Dell branded 102-key Model M, Tab, Enter and Backspace all only have text as legends, no arrow symbols.
1397771	Buckling spring	101	?	No	PS/2	Yes	CompuAdd, URC	Lexmark (for IBM)	1993	Lexmark International, Inc. 1984	For OEM CompuAdd PCs; only Model M made with large L-shaped Enter and 1u Backspace
1397901	?	?	No	Yes	PS/2	Yes	Lexmark logo, ULC	Lexmark	?–1994-?	Lexmark Int'l. Inc 1984	Lexmark branded Model M4 with thick detachable cable. No mouse buttons.
1397956	Buckling spring	101	Yes	No	RJ45	Yes	Gray on oval, ULC	IBM	?–1993-?	IBM Corp. 1984	101 key terminal keyboard with many additional legends on keycaps. Esc key marked as ESC, L-Alt marked as Reset, R-Ctrl marked as Send and most keys in the nav cluster marked differently. Also no lock lights.
1397961	Buckling spring	84?	Yes	Yes	PS/2	Yes	Lexmark logo, ULC	Lexmark	?–1993-1994	Lexmark International, Inc. 1984	Space Saving Keyboard (no numeric keypad or LLP)
1397979	Buckling spring	122	Yes	No	DIN-5	No	Square metal, black on silver, URC	IBM	?–1993-?	IBM Corp. 1985	122 key Model M with function keys marked as "cmd" 1 - 24.
1397003	Buckling spring	122	Yes	Yes	PS/2	Yes	Blue on oval, ULC	IBM UK	?-1993-99?	IBM Corp. 1985	German QWERTZ layout; 122-key terminal made in UK by IBM
1397135	Buckling spring	101	?	Yes	PS/2	No	None	Lexmark	1995	None	Extra legends (blue) for WordPerfect word-processing program
1397599	Buckling spring	101	Yes	Yes	PS/2	Yes (1992+)	Gray, or blue (1993+) on oval, ULC	IBM	1991–1995	IBM Corp. 1984	Similar to 1391401 w/metal stabilizer bars on number pad + and Enter keys
1397651	Buckling spring	101	Yes	Yes	PS/2	No	Gray DELL logo (old style), ULC	Lexmark	1991–92	Lexmark International, Inc. 1984	(At least one example has also been seen with Honeywell logo)
1397661	Buckling spring	101	No (some)	Yes	PS/2	Yes	Gray or blue on oval, ULC	IBM	?-1992-94-?	IBM Corp. 1984	1391401-based variant, usually has one-piece buttons.
1397681	Buckling spring	84	No?	Yes	PS/2 (or AT?)	Yes	Gray or blue on oval, ULC	IBM	?-1991-93-?	IBM Corp. 1984	Space Saving Keyboard (no numeric keypad or LLP)
1397721	Buckling spring	101	Yes	Yes	PS/2 or DIN-5	Yes (1992)	Gray WANG logo in clear oval, ULC	IBM	1991–92	IBM Corp. 1984	Produced during IBM/WANG partnership; most presumed destroyed by WANG
1397735	Buckling spring	101	Yes	Yes	PS/2	No	None (blank oval, LC)	IBM	?-1992-1994-?	IBM Corp. 1984	US 101-key; only IBM-made M variant without logo, one example is dated August 5, 1994 but has the pre-Lexmark style label and only mentions IBM. Also has multi-coloured legends as seen on earlier Model M's. Box says "Ship No: 1397730"
1398155	Buckling spring?	101	?	?	PS/2	?	Lexmark logo, ULC	Lexmark	?-1996	Lexmark International, Inc. 1984	Model M5-1 w/miniature trackball and L/R "click" and "drag" button navigation keys. A 1996 model has the older dark LLP and has green SysRq and R-Alt key.
1398600 1398601	Buckling spring	101	Yes	Yes	AT or PS/2	Yes	Lexmark logo, ULC	Lexmark	?-1992-94-?	Lexmark Int'l Inc 1984	Only std. Model M's sold under Lexmark name
1398609	Buckling spring	101	?	Yes	PS/2	Yes	None	Lexmark	?-1992-?	Lexmark Int'l Inc 1984	No logo indentation; apparently for OEMs to add logo stickers
1399046	Buckling spring	102?	Yes	Yes	PS/2	No	Blue on oval, ULC	IBM UK	?-1992-?	IBM Corporation 1985	Greek layout
1399073	Buckling spring	102?	No	No	PS/2	No	Blue on square, URC	IBM UK	?-1992-?	IBM Corp 1988	Model M2, Slovenian QWERTZ layout
1399338	Buckling spring	122	Yes	No	RJ45	No	Square metal, black on silver, URC	IBM	?-1987-?	IBM Corp 1985	122-Key Model M with contoured modifier keys on the bottom row similar to the Model F 122. Labeled: "Reset/DvCnl, Alt, Alt, Enter"
1399361	Buckling spring?	102	No	No	PS/2	No	Square on Lock Light Panel, URC	IBM UK	?-1994-?	Lexmark Int Inc. 1989	Russian Model M2 with the Russian characters in the top left position on the keycaps in grey and the Latin characters in the bottom right corner in a smaller black typeface. Lock Light Panel and all other keys are in English.
1399570	Buckling spring	102	Yes	No	PS/2	Yes	Blue on oval, ULC	IBM UK	?-1995-?	IBM Corp. 1985	Czech QWERTZ layout
1399571	Buckling spring	102	Yes?	No	PS/2	Yes	Blue on oval, ULC	IBM UK	?-1994-1995-?	IBM Corporation 1985	Slovak QWERTZ layout. Most symbol keys deviate from usual layout, all legends in English.
1399580	Buckling spring	102	Yes	Yes	AT	Yes	Blue on oval, ULC	Lexmark	?-1993-?	Lexmark Int'l Inc 1985	Polish QWERTZ layout
1399625	Buckling spring	101	Yes	No	PS/2	Yes	Blue on oval, ULC	Lexmark, IBM UK	?-1992-1994-?	Lexmark International Inc. 1985 or IBM Corporation 1985	Terminal keyboard; no lock lights
1399912	Buckling spring	101	Yes	Yes	PS/2	Yes	Lexmark logo, ULC	Lexmark	?-1995-?	Lexmark Int'l Inc 1984	Model M5-2 w/trackball, L/R "click" and "drag" buttons above LLP
13H6689	Buckling spring	89	No	No	PS/2	No	IBM, Options by IBM, ULC	Lexmark	?-1994-1995-?	Lexmark Int'l. Inc. 1984	Lexmark-made Model M15 Adjustable Keyboard, although label just says "Manufactured by Lexmark".
13H6705	Buckling spring	101	No	No	PS/2	Yes	Silver on oval, ULC	Lexmark, Maxi Switch	1994–98	Lexmark International, Inc. 1984, or None (Maxi Switch models)	The only black IBM Model M; trackpoint, with keyboard/mouse connectors
1403975	Buckling spring	102	No	No	PS/2	Yes	None (blank rectangle, ULC)	Lexmark	?-1994-?	Lexmark International, Inc. 1984	Spanish QWERTY layout
1403380	Buckling spring	101	Yes	No	AT-keyboard DE9-TrackPoint	Yes	Lexmark logo, ULC	Lexmark	?-1995-?	Lexmark Int'l. Inc. 1984	White Model M13 with Trackpoint II
1404901	Buckling spring	101	Yes	Yes	PS/2	Yes	Lexmark logo, ULC	Lexmark	?-1995-?	Lexmark Int'l. Inc. 1984	White Model M13 with Trackpoint II
2010325	Buckling spring	102	Yes ?	No	PS/2	Yes	Unicomp logo, LLP	Unicomp	?-2002-?	None	Model M5-2 w/trackball, L/R "click" and "drag" buttons above LLP. Portuguese layout. Product is named "Classic Trackball".
2003809; 2054858	Buckling spring	101	No	No	PS/2	Yes	White GE/Marquette logo on dark gray rectangle, ULC	Unicomp	2006-2007 (2003809) ?-2013 (2054858)	None ("Manufactured in USA for G.E. Medical Systems")	For GE/Marquette medical imaging systems. Green and red sublegends on alphanumeric keys; alternate legends on F-keys and number pad. 12 number pad keys are bright yellow; some have red Emerg Save key at F12. Tech-support info panel applied above LLP or F-keys.
20L2532	Buckling spring	101	Yes	No	PS/2	Yes	None (blank rectangle, ULC)	Unicomp	2002–2005-?	None ("Mfg by Unicomp Inc for IBM")	Usually has some custom legends / sub-legends; some seen with colored key caps.
33G3945	Buckling spring?	102	No	No	PS/2	No	Blue on square, URC	IBM UK	?-1993-?	IBM Corp. 1989	French Model M2 with lighter legends on the keycaps on the navigation text of the numpad.
41G3576	Buckling spring	101	Yes	Yes	PS/2	No	Gray on black oval, ULC	IBM	?–1992-1996–?	IBM Corp. 1984	Industrial Model M. Observed on repurposed p/n 1394618
41G3600	Buckling spring	84	Yes	Yes	PS/2	Yes	Silver on black oval, URC	Lexmark	?–1995	Lexmark International, Inc. 1984	Dark grey industrial version of Space Saving Keyboard (no numeric keypad or LLP)
42H0468	Buckling spring	101	No	No	RJ45	No	Blue on square, URC	Lexmark	?-1994-?	Lexmark International Inc. 1984?	Model M2 that came with IBM 3153 Terminal. Has some different key legends such as "Jump" and "Send Line" to the right of the Num Lock key. More details: http://sandy55.fc2web.com/keyboard/42h0468.html
42H1292	Buckling spring	101	Yes (later no)	No	PS/2	Yes	Blue on oval, ULC, LLP (2003)	Lexmark, IBM UK, Unicomp	1995-96 (Lexmark), 1995-99 (IBM UK), ?-2003-? (Unicomp)	Lexmark International Inc. 1984 / none (IBM UK)	One of the final Lexmark-made part numbers. A 2003 model made by Unicomp for IBM also exists with the IBM logo on the lock light panel in the usual Unicomp lock light panel style.
42H1292U	Buckling spring	101	Yes	No	PS/2	Yes	Blue on oval ULC, None - blank rectangle ULC	Unicomp	1996-	Unicomp, Inc. 1984	Optional AT/DIN adapter. Still being made as of 2007 with standard Unicomp style LLP.
51G8572	Buckling spring	101?	Yes	Yes	PS/2	Yes	Gray or blue on oval, ULC	IBM, Lexmark, IBM UK	1992–97	IBM Corp. 1984, Lexmark International, Inc. 1984	Made for IBM RS/6000 system, w/internal speaker for system "beeps"; R Ctrl key says Ctrl/Act
52G9658	Buckling spring	101	Yes	Yes (Later no)	PS/2	Yes	Blue on oval, ULC	IBM, Lexmark	?-1993-?	IBM Corp. 1984; Lexmark International, Inc. 1984	Still retained green legends on Alt keys and two-coloured numpad legends.
52G9700	Buckling spring	101	Yes	No	PS/2	Yes	Blue on oval, ULC	Lexmark	1993–99	Lexmark International, Inc. 1984	
58.003	Buckling spring?	122	Yes ?	No	PS/2	Yes	IO logo, URC	Unicomp	?-2004-2008-?	None,	122-key terminal keyboard made by Unicomp with IO logo on lock light-shaped panel in the upper right corner.
58.066	Buckling spring?	122	Yes	No	PS/2	Yes	None	Unicomp	?-2015-?	None, Made in USA	122-key terminal keyboard made by Unicomp with IO logo on sticker on back of keyboard. Main body is black (including key stems) with white keycaps.
58.069	Rubber Dome	122	No	No	PS/2	Yes	None	Unicomp	?-2012-?	None	Black 122-key terminal keyboard made by Unicomp with IO logo on back sticker. Has normal Unicomp style LLP.
59G7980–59G7981	Buckling spring	101	Yes	Yes	AT	Yes	Blue on oval, ULC	Lexmark	1993	Lexmark International, Inc. 1984	
59G9757	Buckling spring?	101	Yes?	Yes	DIN-5/RS232	Yes	Blue on oval, ULC	Lexmark	?-1993-?	Lexmark International, Inc. 1984	Model M5-2. Has track ball and buttons above lock light indicators. Lexmark label on the back looks very similar to IBM's style of label, not the usual Lexmark style, although there is no mention of IBM on it.
60G0817	Rubber dome	101	No	No	PS/2	Yes	Blue on oval in white rectangle, ULC	IBM	?-1994-1995	Lexmark Intl. Inc. 1984	Model M2 w/full-size (extended) case, codenamed "Lion "; shipped with IBM PS/1 PC. Normal Model M2 IBM logo on LLP blanked out.
60G3507	Buckling spring	101	Yes	No	PS/2	Yes	Blue on square, URC	Lexmark?	?	Lexmark International, Inc. 1984?	Not much info known about this PN. See http://sandy55.fc2web.com/keyboard/42h0468.html
60G3571	Buckling spring	101	Yes	No	PS/2	Yes	Blue on oval, ULC	IBM, Lexmark	?-1993-1994-?	IBM Corp. 1984; Lexmark International, Inc. 1984	Sold separately to retail customers as part of IBM's "Easy Options" program.
60G3572	Buckling spring?	101	Yes	Yes	PS/2	Yes	Blue on oval, ULC	IBM, Lexmark	?-1993-?	Lexmark Int'l, Inc. 1984	Model M5-2. Sold separately to retail customers as part of IBM's "Easy Options" program. Has track ball and buttons above lock light indicators.
61G3974	Buckling spring	103	Yes	No	PS/2	Yes	Blue on oval, ULC	IBM, Lexmark	?-1994-?	Lexmark Int'l, Inc. 1984	Brazilian ABNT2 layout; 104 keys; small stepped right shift key
70G8638	Rubber dome	101	No	No	PS/2	Yes	Gray or blue on oval (Lexmark) or OEM logo, ULC	Lexmark	?-1993-1994-?	Lexmark International. Inc. 1984	Silkscreen-printed keycaps. One model from 1993 is branded "GTSI DeskTop" in the top left corner.
71G4617	Rubber dome	102	No	No	PS/2	Yes	Blue on oval, ULC	IBM UK	?-1994-1996-?	Lexmark International, Inc. 1985	Standard 102-key layout with Arabic/English legends.
71G4621	Rubber dome	102	Yes	No	PS/2	Yes	Blue on oval, ULC	Lexmark (for IBM)	?-1996-?	Lexmark International, Inc. 1984	Danish QWERTY layout
71G4622	Rubber dome	102	No	No	PS/2	Yes	Blue on oval, ULC	Lexmark (for IBM)	?-1995-?	Lexmark International, Inc. 1984	Dutch QWERTY layout, 1378705, EC1391461
71G4623	Rubber dome	102	No	No	PS/2	Yes	Blue on oval, ULC	Lexmark (for IBM)	?-1994-?	Lexmark International, Inc. 1985	Finnish/Swedish QWERTY layout, 1378706, EC1387530
71G4624	Rubber dome?	102	No?	No	PS/2	Yes	Blue on oval, ULC	IBM UK	?-1995-?	Lexmark International, Inc. 1985	French AZERTY layout, with all legends and Num Lock Lights indicators in French.
71G4625	Rubber dome	102	No	No	PS/2	Yes	Gray on oval, ULC	Lexmark (for IBM)	?-1993-96-?	Lexmark International, Inc. 1985	German QWERTZ layout
71G4627	Rubber dome	101?	No	No	PS/2	Yes	Blue on oval, ULC	Lexmark (for IBM)	?-1994-?	Lexmark International, Inc. 1985	Hebrew sub-legends
71G4628	Rubber dome	102	No ?	No	PS/2	Yes	Blue on oval, ULC	IBM UK	?-1995-?	Lexmark International, Inc. 1985	Hungarian variation of the Model M but all text is in English including navigation keys and text on LLP.
71G4630	Rubber dome	102?	No	No	PS/2	Yes	Blue on oval, ULC	Lexmark (for IBM)	?-1994-?	Lexmark International, Inc. 1984	Italian QWERTY layout
71G4635	Rubber dome	102	No	No	PS/2	Yes	Blue on oval, ULC	Lexmark (for IBM)	?-1994-?	Lexmark International, Inc.	Russian QWERTY layout
71G4638	Rubber dome	102	No	No	PS/2	Yes	Blue on oval, ULC	Lexmark (for IBM)	?-1993-?	Lexmark International, Inc. 1984	Spanish QWERTY layout
71G4643	Rubber dome	102	Yes	No	PS/2	Yes	Blue on oval, ULC	Lexmark, IBM UK	?-1993-1996-?	Lexmark International, Inc. 1984/1985	Standard UK 102-key layout
71G4644	Rubber dome	101	No	No	PS/2, RJ45	Yes	Blue on oval, ULC	Lexmark	?-1993-1996	Lexmark International, Inc. 1984	1996 RJ45 model exists with the old style LLP.
71G6120	Rubber dome	101	No	No	PS/2	No	"GTSI DeskTop", ULC	Lexmark	?-1994-?	Lexmark Int'l, Inc. 1984	Model M2 w/full-size (extended) case. GTSI DeskTop branding on outer case, normal Model M2 IBM logo on LLP blanked out. Does have IBM logo at the end of the cable.
71U4623 1387530 1378706 EC	Rubber dome	102	No	No	PS/2	Yes	Blue on oval, ULC	Lexmark	?-1995-?	Lexmark International, Inc. 1985	Swedish QWERTY layout
73G4614	Rubber dome?	101	No	No	PS/2	No	Blue on square, URC	Lexmark	?-1994-1995-?	Lexmark International, Inc. 1984	Standard ANSI Model M2
1387526	Buckling spring	102	Yes	Yes	PS/2, AT	No	Black on square silver metal, URC	IBM UK	?-1984-86-?	IBM CORPORATION	Danish QWERTY layout
1390137	Buckling spring	102	Yes	Yes	PS/2, AT	No	Black on square silver metal, URC	IBM UK	?-1986-87-?	IBM CORPORATION	Danish QWERTY layout
8126582	Buckling spring	101/102?	No	No	PS/2	No	Black Advent logo URC	IBM UK	?-1993-?	Lexmark Int Inc. 1989	Model M2 with "Advent" branding on Lock Light Panel. Lock Lights are also visually different compared to normal M2 models.
8131276	Buckling spring	101	No	No	RJ25	Yes	Blue on square, URC	IBM UK	?-1997	IBM Corp.	
8184692	Buckling spring	101	Yes	Yes	PS/2	Yes	Gray on oval, ULC ("IBM Soft Touch Keyboard")	Lexmark	1994 - 1995	Lexmark International, Inc. 1984	Soft Touch Keyboard with greased springs (not many produced)
84G2525	Buckling Rubber Sleeve	74	Yes	Yes	PS/2	No	Blue on black oval	Lexmark	?-1995-?	Lexmark International, Inc. 1984	Black Model M4-1 Compact Trackpoint Keyboard with detachable SDL cable and 2 PS/2 cable ends. Has LLP in URC.
84H8503	Rubber Dome/Buckling Rubber Sleeve?	84	No	Yes	PS/2	No	Gray on oval, ULC (Text and badge gray, lettering extrudes)	Key Tronic, Unicomp	?-1996-1998-?	None, Made for IBM by Key Tronic or Mfg by Unicomp for IBM	Model M4-1 Compact Trackpoint Keyboard
84H8525	Rubber Dome/Buckling Rubber Sleeve?	18	No	Yes	PS/2	Yes?	None	Unicomp	?-1998-?	None, Mfg by Unicomp for IBM	Model M4-1 standalone Numpad, images: https://imgur.com/a/M8KEe9K
82G2383	Buckling spring	101	Yes	No	PS/2	Yes	Blue on oval, ULC	Lexmark	1993–99	Lexmark International, Inc. 1984	
82G2384	Buckling spring	102	Yes	No	PS/2	Yes	Blue on oval, ULC	Lexmark	?-1995-?	Lexmark International, Inc. 1984	Spanish (ISO layout)
82G2385	Buckling spring	102	Yes	No	PS/2	Yes	Blue on gray oval, ULC	Lexmark, Unicomp	?-1995-1999-?	Lexmark International Inc. 1984; None ("Mfg by Unicomp Inc for IBM")	French (ISO layout)
82G3281	Buckling spring	101	No	No	PS/2	Yes	Blue on gray oval, ULC	Lexmark	1994–95	Lexmark International, Inc. 1984	White Model M13 w/trackpoint, two connectors for keyboard and mouse
82G3283	Buckling spring?	102?	No ?	No	PS/2	Yes	Blue on gray oval, ULC	Lexmark	?-1994-?	Lexmark Int'l, Inc. 1984	White Spanish Model M13 w/trackpoint, two connectors for keyboard and mouse
82G3295	Buckling spring	101	Yes	No	PS/2	Yes	Blue on gray oval, ULC	Lexmark	?-1995-?	Lexmark International, Inc. 1984	Standard 101-key Model M
88G3936	Buckling spring	104	Yes	Yes	PS/2	Yes	IBM Grey on oval, ULC	Lexmark	?-1994-?	Lexmark International, Inc. 1984	Brazilian ABNT2 layout; 104 keys; small stepped right shift key.
92G7453 92G7454	Buckling spring	101	No	No	PS/2	Yes	Blue on oval, ULC	Lexmark	1995-1996-?	Lexmark Int'l. Inc. 1984	Sold separately to retail customers as part of IBM's "Easy Options" program
92G7453	Buckling spring	101	Yes	Yes	PS/2	Yes	Blue on oval, ULC	Manufactured for IBM by Lexmark	?-1994-?	Lexmark Int'l. Inc. 1984	Sold separately to retail customers as part of IBM's "Easy Options" program. A 1994 model exists with the older style thick detachable grey coiled cable.
92G7455, 92G9757	Buckling spring	101	Yes	Yes	PS/2	Yes	Blue on oval, ULC	Lexmark	1993–95	Lexmark Int'l. Inc. 1984	Model M5-2 w/trackball, L/R "click" and "drag" buttons above LLP
92G7461	Buckling spring	101	Yes	No	PS/2	Yes	Blue on oval, ULC	Lexmark, later Maxi Switch	?-1995-1997-?	Lexmark Int'l. Inc. 1984	White Model M13 with Trackpoint II; optional mouse port
92G7481	Buckling spring?	101	Yes ?	No	PS/2	Yes	Blue on oval, ULC	Maxi Switch	?-1997-?	None, Manufactured for IBM by Maxi Switch	White ANSI Model M13 with black cable and older style lock light panel.
96U1114	Rubber dome	101?	Yes	No	PS/2	Yes	Unicomp logo on LLP	Unicomp	?-2000-?	None	Model M5-2 w/trackball, L/R "click" and "drag" buttons above LLP. Product is named "Classic Trackball".
AC40956	Buckling spring?	122	Yes	No	PS/2	Yes	None, blank panel in ULC	Unicomp	?-2018-?	None, "Made in USA"	Black YESboard® 122-key Model M with Affirmative logo on Lock Light Panel. Designed for use with iSeries, AS/400.
CPC0412	Buckling spring?	101	Yes?	No	PS/2	Yes	None, blank panel in ULC	Unicomp	?-2015-?	None, "Made in USA"	Standard ANSI Model M with some secondary blue legends on some keys, for example the Enter key is dual marked with "Field Exit" in blue as is the R-Ctrl with "Enter". Function keys also are dual marked F13-F24.
KBPC122-5250U	Buckling spring?	122	Yes?	No	USB	Yes	None, blank panel in ULC	Unicomp	?-2019-?	None, "Made in USA"	Black 122-key Model M with blue and black legends on keycaps. Has "TwinData" logo on back label.
UB40416	Buckling spring	101	Yes	No	PS/2	Yes	Unicomp logo on LLP	Unicomp	?-Present	Unicomp, Inc. 1984	101-key, black w/light gray keys
UB4041A	Buckling spring	101	Yes	No	USB	Yes	Unicomp logo on LLP	Unicomp	?-Present	Unicomp, Inc. 1984	101-key, black w/light gray keys
UB40446	Buckling spring	104	Yes	No	PS/2	Yes	Unicomp logo on LLP	Unicomp	?-Present	Unicomp, Inc. 1984	104-key, black w/light gray keys
UB4044A	Buckling spring	104	Yes	No	USB	Yes	Unicomp logo on LLP	Unicomp	?-Present	Unicomp, Inc. 1984	104-key, black w/light gray keys
UB40P36	Buckling spring	103	Yes	No	PS/2	Yes	Unicomp logo on LLP	Unicomp	?-Present	Unicomp, Inc. 1984	103-key Ultra Classic (compact case), black w/light gray keys
UB40P3A	Buckling spring	103	Yes	No	USB	Yes	Unicomp logo on LLP	Unicomp	?-Present	Unicomp, Inc. 1984	103-key Ultra Classic (compact case), black w/light gray keys
UB40P46	Buckling spring	104	Yes	No	PS/2	Yes	Unicomp logo on LLP	Unicomp	?-Present	Unicomp, Inc. 1984	104-key Ultra Classic (compact case), beige w/classic light/dark beige keys
UB40P4A	Buckling spring	104	Yes	No	USB	Yes	Unicomp logo on LLP	Unicomp	?-Present	Unicomp, Inc. 1984	104-key Ultra Classic (compact case), beige w/classic light/dark beige keys
UB40R46	Buckling spring	104	No	No	PS/2	Yes	?	Unicomp	?	Unicomp, Inc. 1984	104-key
UB4ZPHA	Buckling spring	104	Yes	No	USB	No	Unicomp logo on LLP	Unicomp	?-Present	Unicomp, Inc. 1984	104-key Ultra Classic (compact case), black with light/dark beige keys, for Apple Mac OS
UNI041A; UNI0416	Buckling spring	101	Yes	No	USB	Yes	Unicomp logo on LLP	Unicomp	?-2012–Present	Unicomp, Inc. 1984	101-key, beige w/classic light/dark beige keys
UNI0446	Buckling spring	104	Yes	No	PS/2	Yes	Unicomp logo on LLP	Unicomp	?-Present	Unicomp, Inc. 1984	104-key, beige w/classic light/dark beige keys
UNI044A	Buckling spring	104	Yes	No	USB	Yes	Unicomp logo on LLP	Unicomp	?-Present	Unicomp, Inc. 1984	104-key, beige w/classic light/dark beige keys. Newer models have no Unicomp logo.
UNI0476	Buckling spring	101	Yes?	No	PS/2	Yes	None, rectangle blank ULC	Unicomp	?-2019-?	None, Made in USA	101-key Model M5-2 with purple trackball on the URC above the LLP. Non-detachable cable has 2 PS/2 connections.
UNI0852	Buckling spring	122	Yes?	No	PS/2	Yes	None, rectangle blank ULC	Unicomp	?-2000-?	None, Made in USA	Standard 122-key Model M made by Unicomp with cable gutter, larger feet and non-detachable coiled cable.
UNI0P46	Buckling spring	104	Yes	No	PS/2	Yes	Unicomp logo on LLP	Unicomp	?-Present	Unicomp, Inc. 1984	104-key Ultra Classic (compact case), beige w/classic light/dark beige keys
UNI0T56	Buckling spring	122	No	No	PS/2	Yes	None (blank rectangle, ULC)	Unicomp	?-2003-?	?	122-key, for PC/5250 emulators; produces standard 101-key scancodes mapped to standard keys with modifiers (e.g. F24 appears to the PC as Shift+F12)
UNIZPHA	Buckling spring	104	Yes	No	USB	No	Unicomp logo on LLP	Unicomp	?-2014–Present	Unicomp, Inc. 1984	104-key Ultra Classic (compact case), beige with light/dark beige keys, for Apple Mac OS
UNZ2416	Buckling spring	101	No	No	PS/2	Yes	White GE/Marquette logo on dark gray rectangle, ULC; Unicomp logo on LED panel	Unicomp	?-2002-?	None	For GE/Marquette medical imaging systems; features similar to 2003809
UW40P4A	Buckling spring	104	Yes	No	PS/2	Yes	Unicomp logo on LLP	Unicomp	?-Present	Unicomp, Inc. 1984	104-key Ultra Classic (compact case), black w/white keys
UW4ZP4A	Buckling spring	104	Yes	No	USB	No	Unicomp logo on LLP	Unicomp	?-Present	Unicomp, Inc. 1984	104-key Ultra Classic (compact case), black w/white keys, for Apple Mac OS
XR4R4G6	Buckling spring	101?	?	No	PS/2	Yes	Unicomp logo on LLP	Unicomp	?-2008-?	None	Black (only?) trackpoint w/two connectors for keyboard and mouse (Unicomp pointing device instead of IBM Trackpoint II)
unknown, can't read label	Buckling spring?	?	Yes?	Yes	PS/2	No	Black on square gray metal, URC	IBM UK?	?-1987?-?	IBM Corporation	English and Arabic layout. Some keys are different such as Page Up and Page which have arrows, Insert and Delete which have 122-terminal like keycaps and the backspace and enter keys read "Backspace" and "New Line" with no arrows on them. Tab, Caps Lock, Shift (L&R) and Left Ctrl all have secondary legends on the front of the keys.
UT40U4A	Buckling spring	104	No	No	USB	No	Unicomp logo on LLP	Unicomp	2020–Present	None; "Made in USA"	The Unicomp "New Model M" made with new tooling. Black case; options for white, gray, or white and gray keys.
UB40E7A	Buckling spring	87	No	Yes	USB	No	None	Unicomp	2020–Present	None; "Made in USA"	The Unicomp "Mini-M" made with new tooling. Black case; options for gray or white and gray keys.

Note: Manufacture dates are approximate.

== Gallery ==
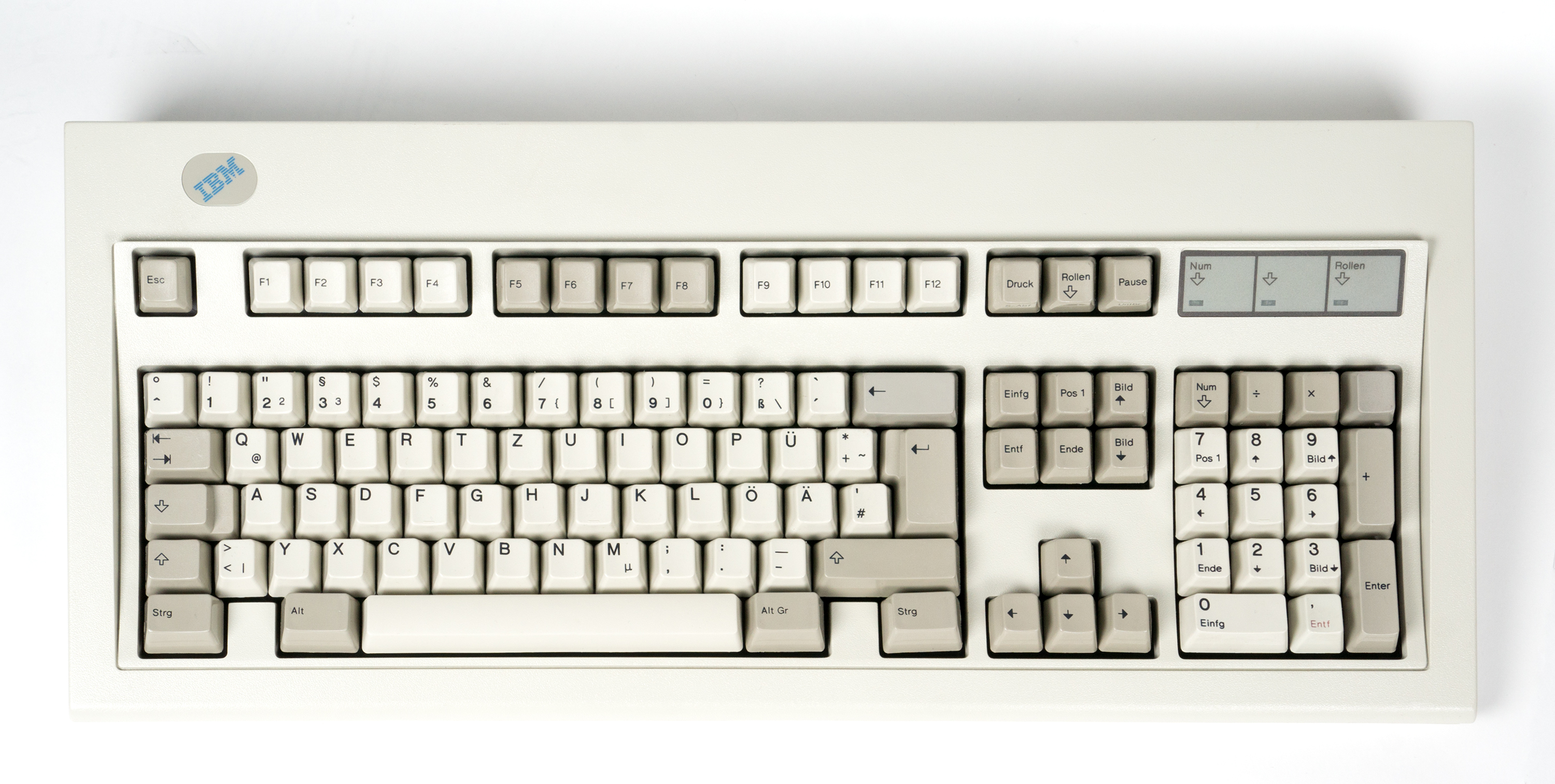
1995 IBM Model M (P/N 1391403) (German)

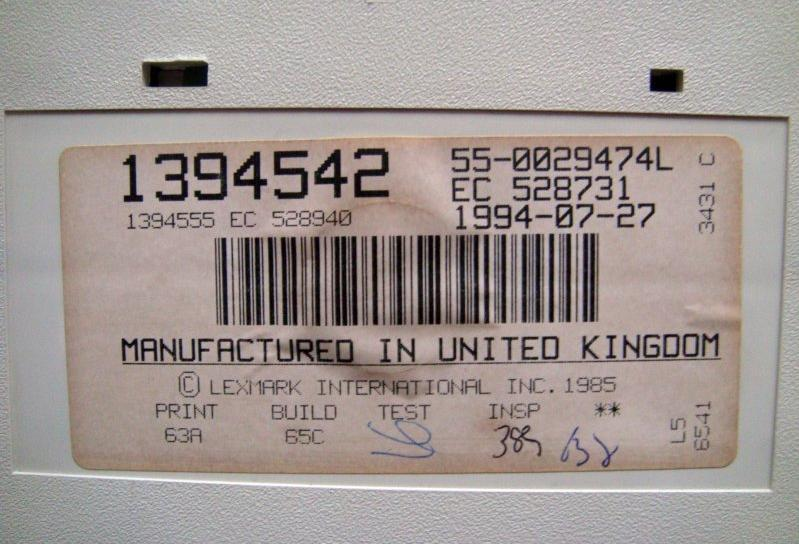
1994 IBM Model M (P/N 1394542) label

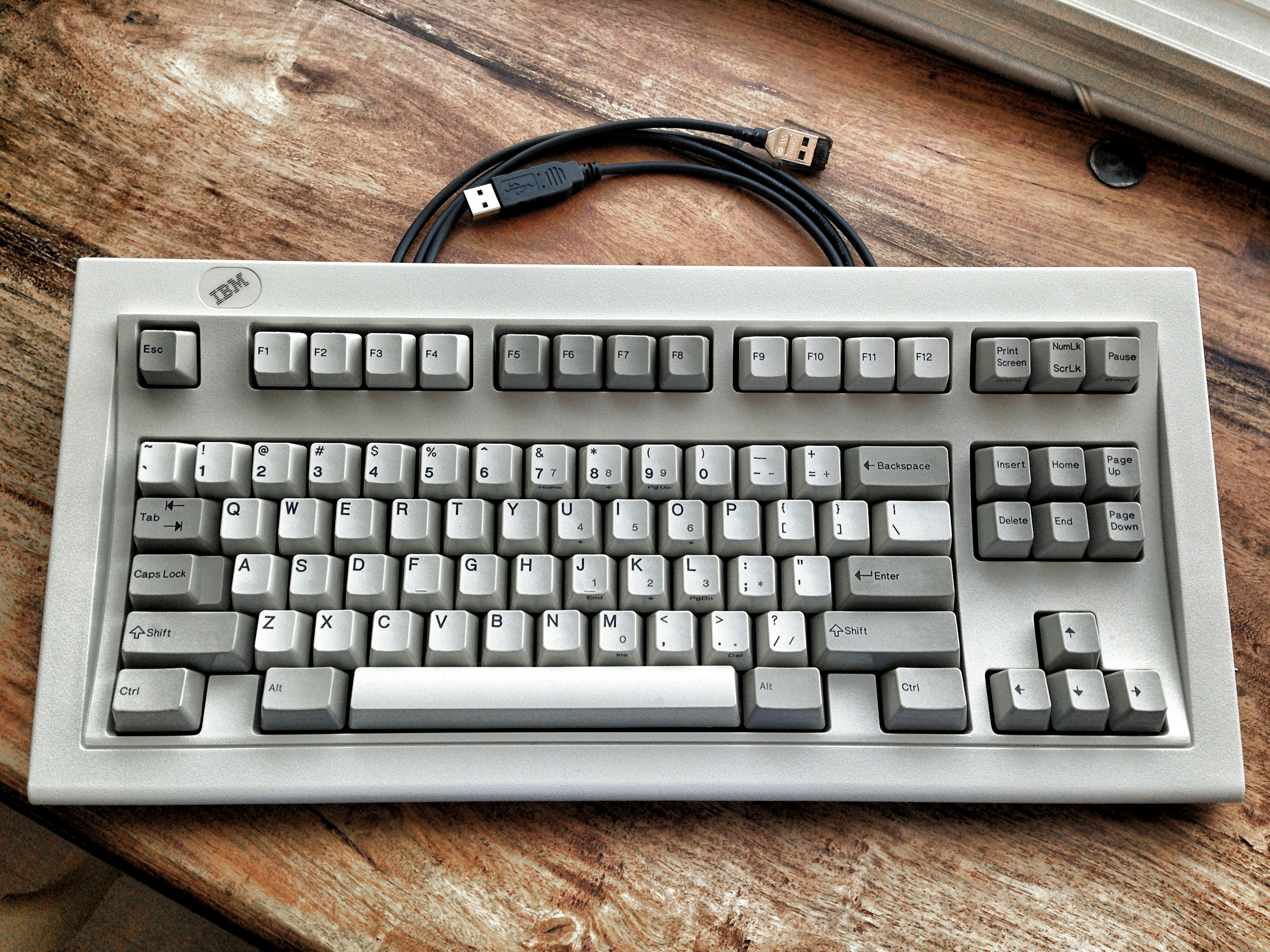
1987 IBM Model M Space Saving Keyboard P/N 1391472 (no numpad) with SDL to USB adapter

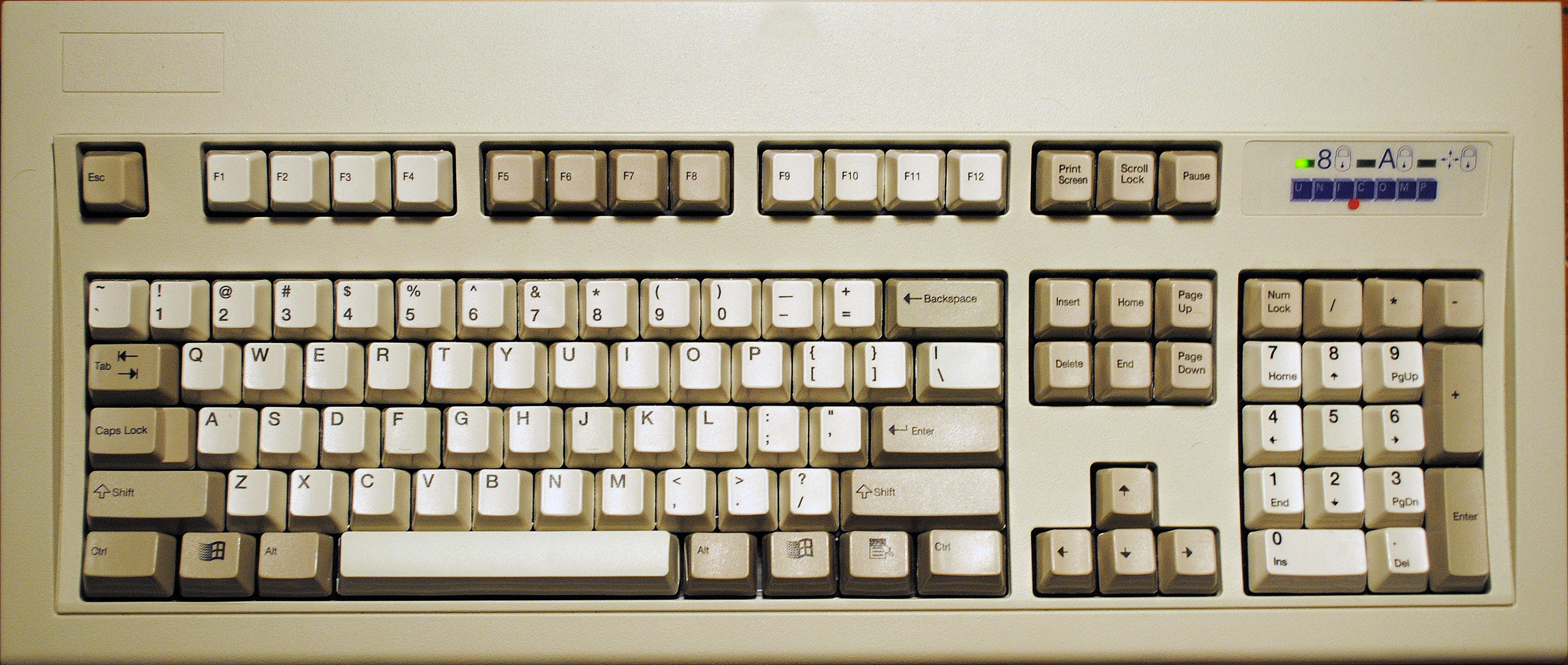
2012 Unicomp Classic 104 (P/N UNI044A)

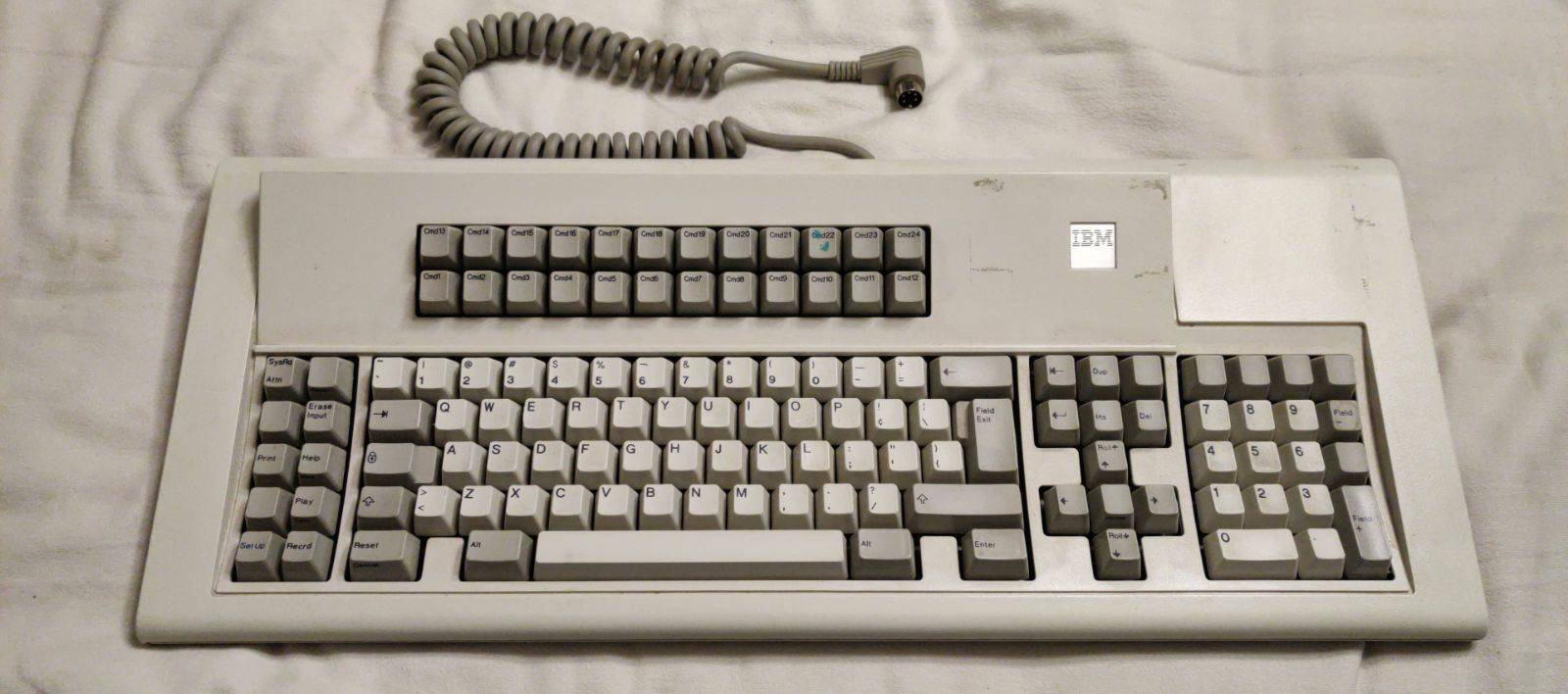
IBM Model M keyboard, part number 1390572

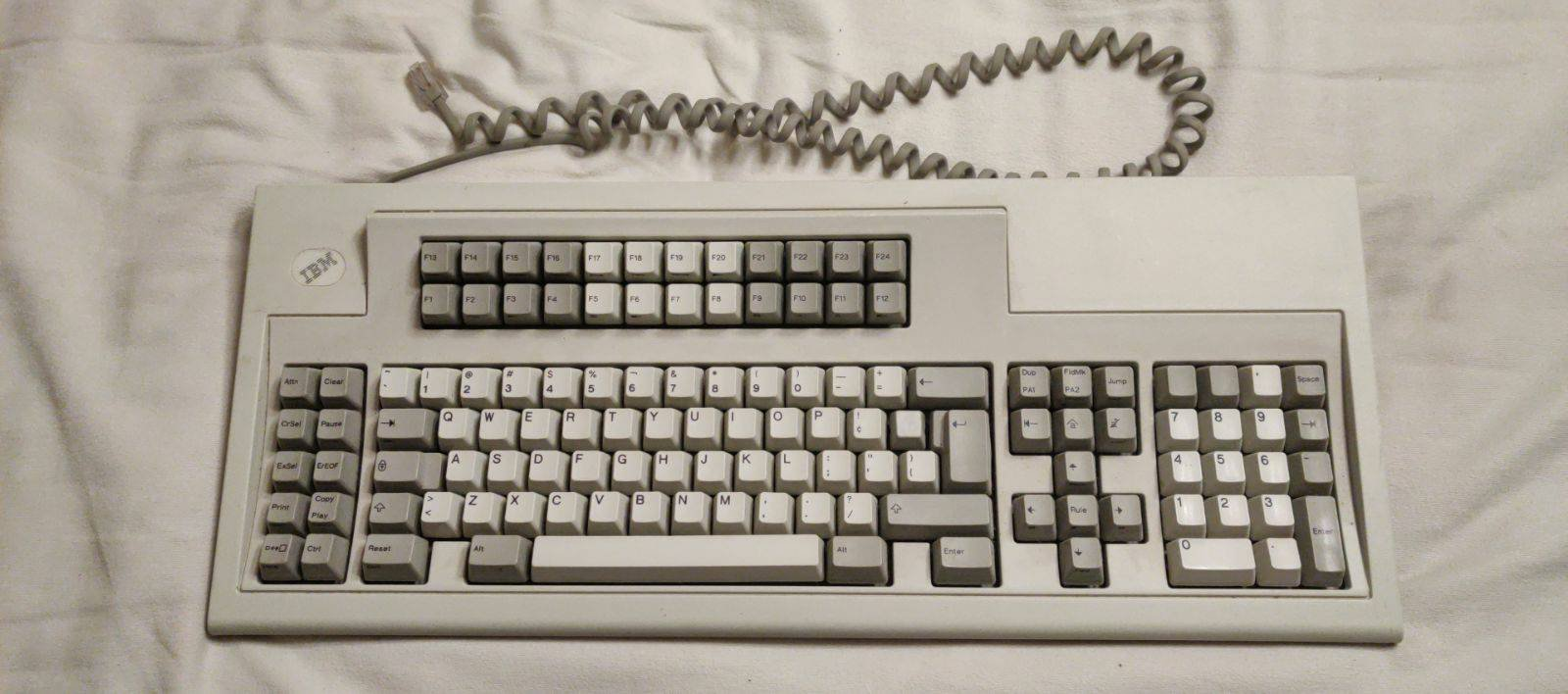
IBM Model M keyboard, part number 1394100

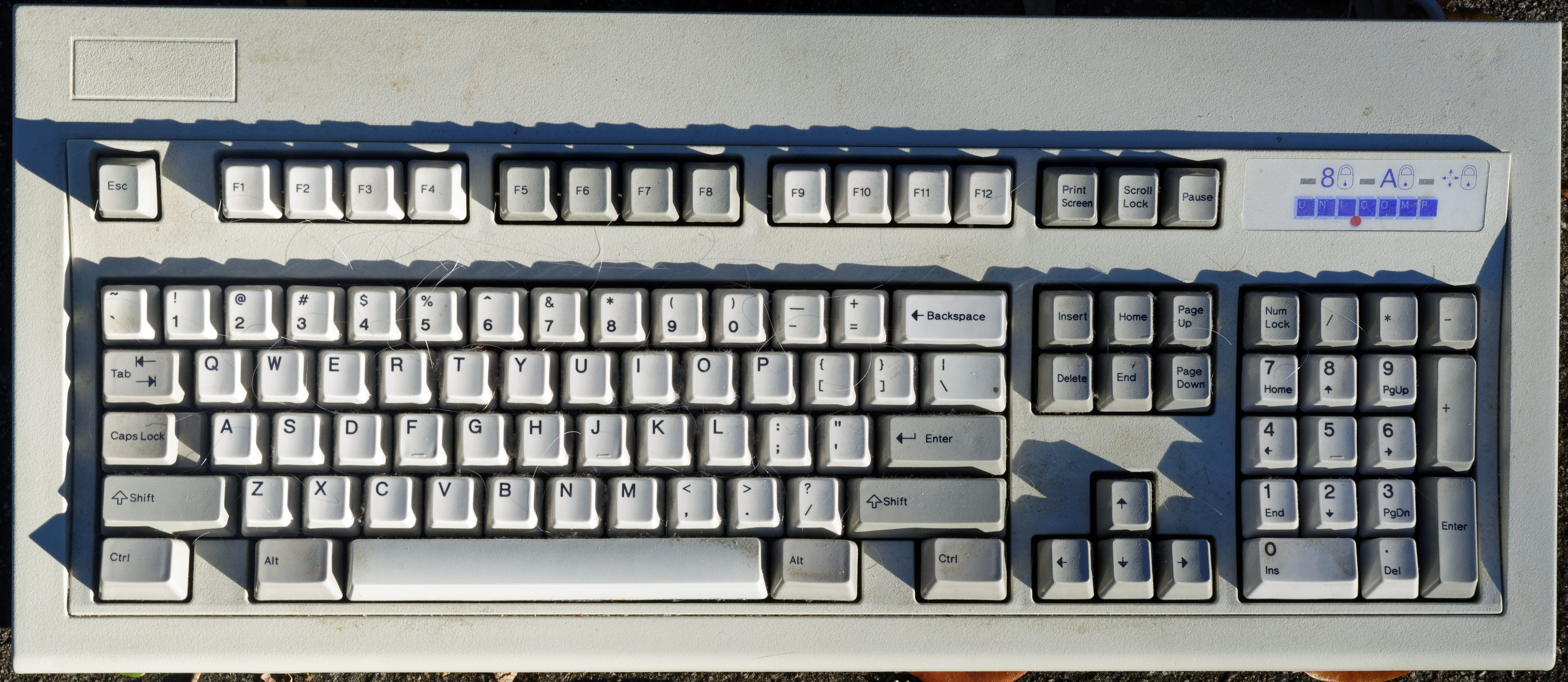
Unicomp classic 101

== See also ==
- IBM PC keyboard
- Model F keyboard
- IBM PS/2 Mouse, the corresponding mouse for the IBM PS/2
- List of mechanical keyboards
