= HIL bus =

Computer bus

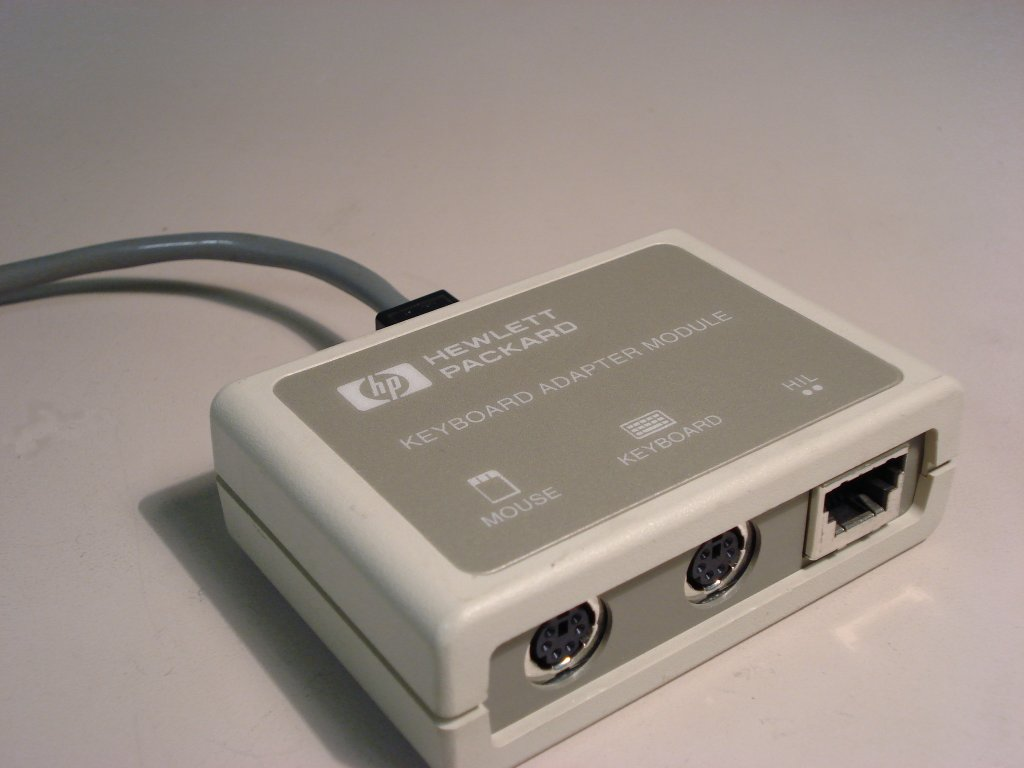
HP HIL Adapter, which allows standard PC keyboards and mice to be added to an HIL host. Note the pass-through port on the right, which allowed other HIL devices to be daisy-chained through this one.

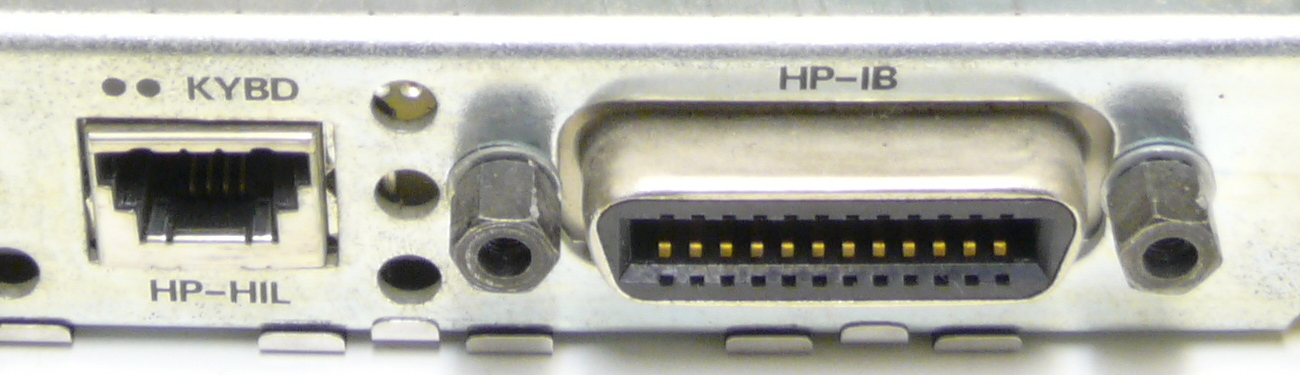
A HP-HIL connector for keyboards next to a HP-IB connector on an HP9000-310 workstation

The HP-HIL (Hewlett-Packard Human Interface Link) is the name of a computer bus used by Hewlett-Packard to connect keyboards, mice, trackballs, digitizers, tablets, barcode readers, rotary knobs, touchscreens, and other human interface peripherals to their HP 9000 workstations. The bus was in use until the mid-1990s, when HP substituted PS/2 technology for HIL. The PS/2 peripherals were themselves replaced with USB-connected models.

The HIL bus is a daisy-chain of up to 7 devices, running at a raw clock speed of 8 MHz. Each HIL device typically has an output connector, and an input connector to which the next device in the chain plugs; the exception is the mouse which has only the output connector.

HIL buses can be found on HP PA-RISC and m68k based machines, some early HP Vectra computers, as well as in some HP/Agilent Logic Analyzers. HP-UX, OpenBSD, Linux and NetBSD include drivers for the HIL bus and HIL devices.

The HP-HIL bus uses specific 4-pin, 6-pin, or 8-pin SDL connectors, somewhat similar to the 8P8C 8-pin modular connector commonly (though incorrectly) called the RJ-45. The bus can reportedly also use a 9-pin D-subminiature DE-9 connector.

A HIL to PS/2 converter is available, namely the HP A4220-62001.

== Specification ==
- HP-HIL Technical Reference Manual, HP P/N 45918A
