= HeroRace =

Russian cross-country obstacle race

- Location: Moscow, St. Petersburg, Tula, Bryansk, Samara, Kazan, Yekaterinburg, Crimea, Chelyabinsk, Novosibirsk, Tyumen, Krasnoyarsk, Grozny, Khabarovsk, Vladivostok, Petropavlovsk-Kamchatsky, Baku (Russia)
- Established: 2013
- Website: лигагероев.рф

The HeroRace (Gonka Geroev, Russian: Гонка Героев) is an extreme cross-country obstacle race held in Russia by the Heroleague organization. The project is curated by Ksenia Shoygu.

The obstacle courses at military training grounds remain the property of the Russian Ministry of Defense. They are also used for training exercises and various other challenges for the Russian Armed Forces.

== History ==
The first, trial HeroRace was held in 2013 on the Alabino military training grounds, with approximately 300 participants. The second race, held in 2014 in Moscow, brought together about 10,000 participants and guests.

In 2015, the HeroRace already expanded to 7 cities, Moscow, St. Petersburg, Kazan, Vladivostok, Kaliningrad, Chelyabinsk, and Yekaterinburg. With 50 extreme cross-country events, and a total of 50,000 participants and spectators. By 2016, the race spanned a total of 16 locations: Moscow, St. Petersburg, Kazan, Vladivostok, Kaliningrad, Chelyabinsk, Yekaterinburg, Tyumen, Crimea, Khabarovsk, Novosibirsk, Samara, Ulan-Ude, Ulyanovsk, Tula, and Petropavlovsk-Kamchatsky. With a total attendance of approximately of 250,000 participants and guests.

In 2017, the number of locations increased to 17: Moscow, St. Petersburg, Kazan, Chelyabinsk, Yekaterinburg, Tyumen, Crimea, Khabarovsk, Novosibirsk, Samara, Krasnoyarsk, Bryansk, Tula, Petropavlovsk-Kamchatsky, Vladivostok, Grozny, and Baku. The events brought together roughly 400,000 participants and spectators.

The organizers planned involve 13 host locations in 2018, including Moscow, St. Petersburg, Kazan, Vladivostok, Chelyabinsk, Yekaterinburg, Tula, Samara, Crimea, Grozny, Novosibirsk, Khabarovsk, and Petropavlovsk-Kamchatsky. The project's partners include Toyota and Gazprom Media.

== Participation ==
The only requirement for taking part in the HeroRace is the purchase of a ticket on the project’s website. The price depends on the location of the specific event. The race is open to anyone over the age of 18. The participation package includes obligatory health insurance coverage. The participants are usually grouped into teams, but it is possible to race one on one.

Everyone who contributes to the race receives a commemorative tag on a steel chain. Starting from 2017, the tags can be engraved with a custom design. Over the years, the race has seen appearances of such celebrity guests as Mikhail Galustyan, Ksenia Sukhinova, Vyacheslav Malafeev, Artemy Lebedev, Askold Zapashny, Alla Mikheeva and Denis Lebedev.

== Formats ==
=== HeroRace ===
The race covers two different location types: military training grounds (under the auspices of the Russian Ministry of Defense) and civilian facilities. Its program also includes special corporate days, encouraging the fee-based participation of business community representatives. The main feature of military-hosted races is the extensive use of blank shots and smoke screens for realistic battle simulation. The obstacle course challenges include crawling under tanks. By contrast, the civilian format of the cross-country race focuses on exploring Russia’s most scenic locations, from ski resorts to recreational parks, mountainsides and valleys.

The challenges presented to the contestants are also diverse: monkey bars, climbing walls, army obstacle courses, spring boards, zip lines, and many others. The rules for passing the obstacles are unique for every location.

=== Winter HeroRace ===
Races of this format are held in winter at civilian locations. Their key feature is the use of obstacles built out of snow and ice. Over the years, the Winter Heroes events have been hosted at the following locations:

- 2016—the Otkritie Arena Stadium in Moscow.
- 2017—the Mitino Landscape Park in Moscow and the Sheregesh Ski Resort in the Kemerovo Oblast.
- 2018—the Krylatskoye Rowing Canal in Moscow and the Igora Year-Round Resort in St. Petersburg.

Over 7,000 people have taken part in the winter race throughout the format’s history.

=== Night HeroRace ===
This version of the extreme obstacle race is held at night. The first trials took place in 2016. In 2017, the new race format was adopted by several Russian regions, with events in Moscow, St. Petersburg, and Novosibirsk. The race has a few specific must-have features, such as light shows, torches, and glow-in-the-dark markings.

=== HeroRace Children ===
The children's version of the HeroRace debuted in 2015 at the Vorobyovy Gory Pioneers Palace in Moscow. More than 500 children took part in the event. During the next 2 years, the project stagnated, due to difficulties with arranging events for minors.

Starting from 2018, Little HeroRace has been brought back as part of the classical Race, held on a separate obstacle course.

=== Winter hell ===
The first Winterhell Race, hosted by the Heroleague in the European Union, took place on January 20, 2018, at the Nürburgring race track in Germany. The event brought together approximately 1,000 participants from a number of countries: Germany, Austria, Belgium, Russia, and several others.

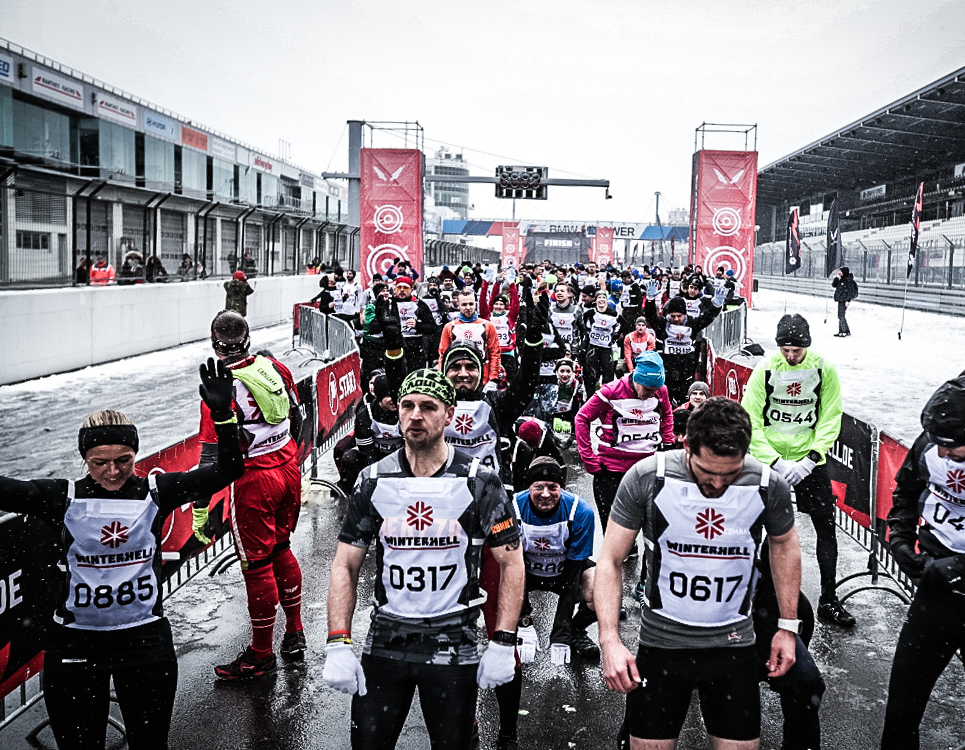

=== Mubarizler ===
The Mubarizler event in Baku, Azerbaijan, was first held in 2017 at the training centre of the local Ministry of Internal Affairs. It has the same format as the classical HeroRace.

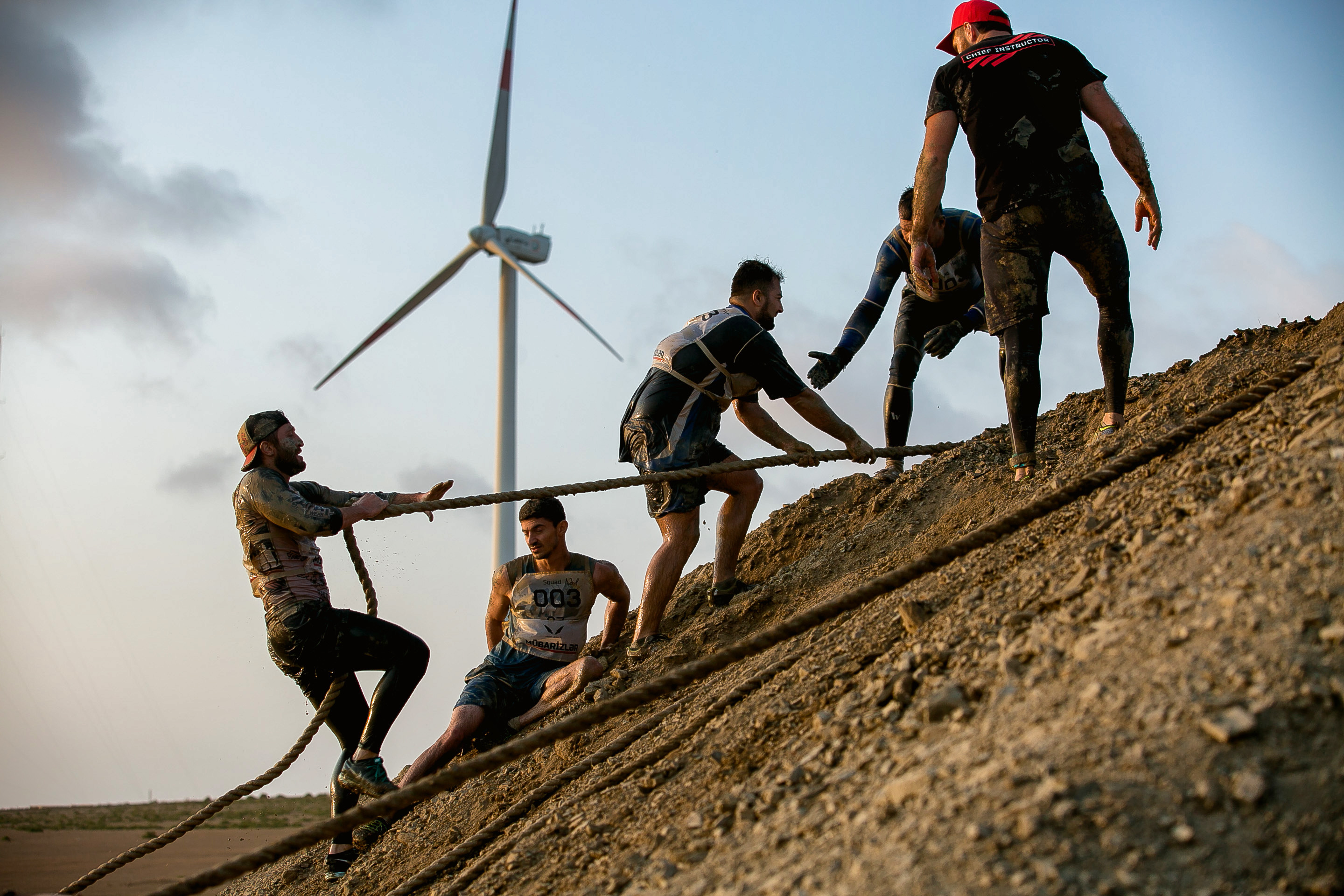

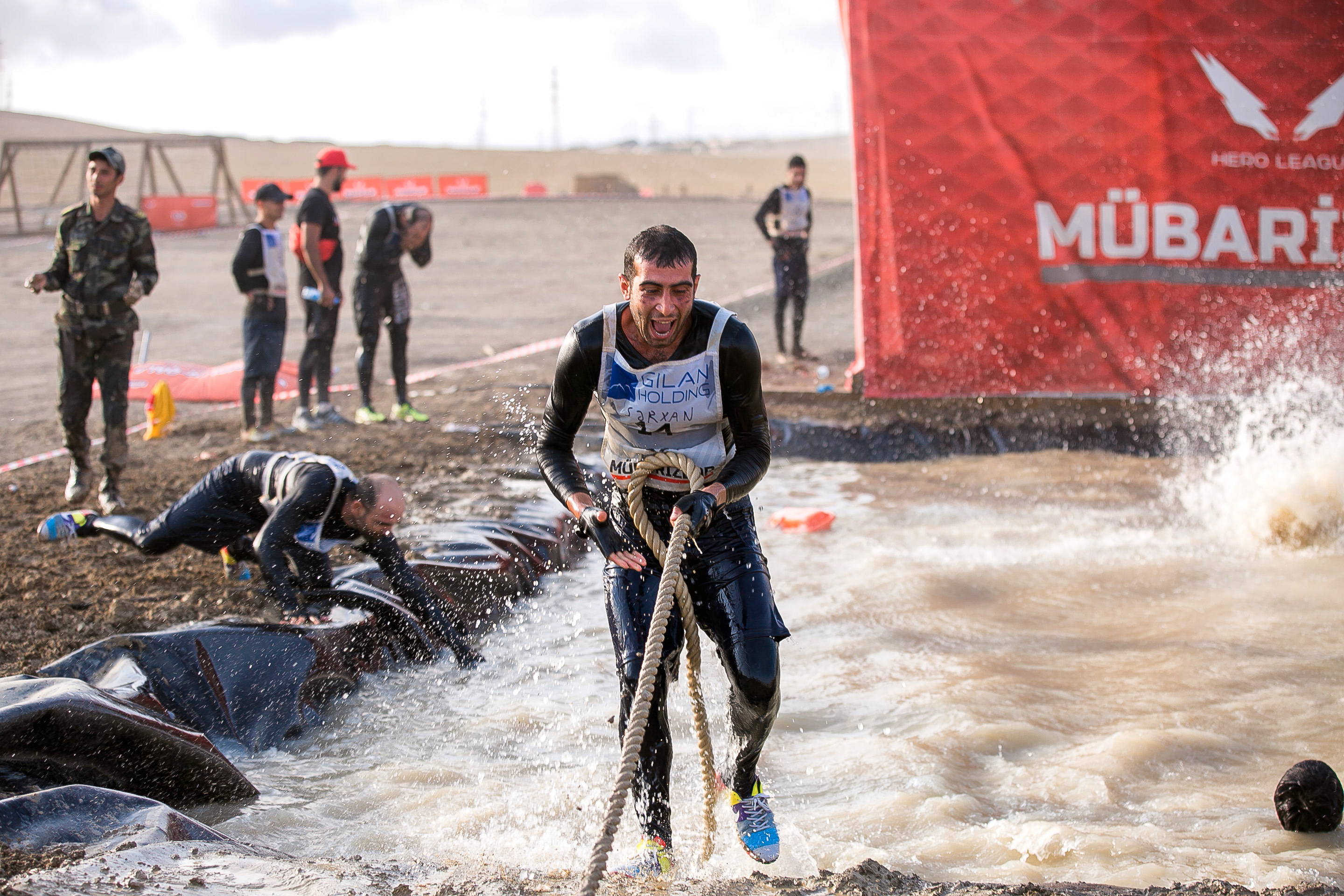

=== HeroRace Championships ===
This is a special timed event for those who prefer a more competitive challenge. The timing of the race is tracked with the use of professional equipment. This event is also hosted both at military training grounds and civilian locations. There are 4 participation options: solo male, solo female, paired race, and team race.

The process of passing the obstacle course is governed by special guidelines, which include a set of rules and penalty points for breaking these rules. Scores are awarded for speed, timing, and technique. The race has an extensive prize pool, formed out of sponsor contributions.
