= Parse (disambiguation) =

Parse normally refers to parsing, the process of analyzing text.

Parse, parser, or parsing may also refer to:

- Pârse or Pârsa, the Persian word for Persepolis

== People ==
- Scott Parse (born 1984), an American professional ice hockey player

== Companies ==
- Parsé Semiconductor Co., an Iranian company

== Grammar and string analysis ==
- Parsing expression grammar, a type of analytic formal grammar that describes a formal language
- Parsing, syntax analysis, or syntactic analysis is a process of analyzing a string of symbols
- Parse tree, an ordered, rooted tree that represents the syntactic structure of a string

== Computer programming ==
- Parser Grammar Engine, a compiler and runtime system for Raku rules for the Parrot virtual machine
- Parse (platform), a mobile software development backend originally created by a cloud services company of the same name
- Parser (programming language), a programming language for scripts run on a web server
- Parser combinator, (computer programming) a higher-order function that accepts several parsers as input and returns a new parser as its output
- Compiler-compiler, a "parser compiler" or a "compiler generator" is a programming tool that creates a parser, interpreter, or compiler
- Earley parser, an algorithm for parsing strings

== See also ==
- Parsee
