= Optimus Maximus keyboard =

Special keyboard

The Optimus Maximus keyboard, previously just "Optimus keyboard", is a keyboard developed by the Art. Lebedev Studio, a Russian design studio headed by Artemy Lebedev. Each of its keys is a display which can dynamically change to adapt to the keyboard layout in use or to show the function of the key. It was launched initially in 2007 and is no longer available to new orders.

== Overview ==
Photoshop layout (Mac, prototype rendering)

Quake III Arena layout. The production model uses the same 48 × 48 display for all keys including the space bar, unlike this rendering.

The design featured on the studio's website received attention on the web when it was featured on Slashdot on 14 July 2005, and afterwards for a few weeks on other technology websites. The original release date was "end of 2006", however production issues caused the Optimus mini three to be developed first, with the full keyboard delayed until the end of 2007. The keyboard was number 10 in the Wired Magazine 2006 Vaporware Awards and number 4 on the list in 2007 due to its numerous delays and feature reductions.

The Optimus allows for greater user interaction, by dynamically displaying the current function of the keys. For example, when the user presses the shift key, the pictures would change to upper-case versions. It would also make switching between different keyboard layouts (such as English and Cyrillic) rapid, and could make the switch to alternative layouts such as Dvorak easier for people who only have a QWERTY keyboard with no possibility of rearranging the keys. To demonstrate this concept, there are computer renderings showing example layouts for Quake III Arena and Adobe Photoshop.

A patent application filed on 13 March 2007 suggests that Apple Inc. may be working on a similar dynamically changeable organic light-emitting diode (OLED) keyboard.

=== Optimus mini three ===
Art. Lebedev Studio released a smaller three-key version of their keyboard, named Optimus mini three. Each of the keys is larger than a standard key. The mini three can be adjusted, through the configuration software, to either a horizontal or vertical orientation.

Initial reviews were mixed. The keyboard functions as advertised, but it has been criticized for inordinately high CPU usage, slow response time, and buggy configuration software.

=== Optimus Aux ===
On 21 July 2008, Engadget posted about a new version of the keyboard, originally named Optimus Pultius. It features 15 OLED keys in a three-by-five arrangement and a USB port. Engadget also reported that the Pultius had been renamed to the Aux and included a new rendering of the rear side, showing that there would be two USB ports instead of one.

=== Optimus Popularis ===
In 2014, the existing models in the Optimus range were discontinued and superseded by the "Optimus Popularis" model which uses a single large LCD screen under the transparent keyboard instead of individual OLED displays for each key.

== Similar keyboards ==
The patent for this "Display Keyboard" expired in 2016. However, the first programmable LCD keyboard was developed in the mid-1980s in Germany. This keyboard, sold under the LCBoard name in the U.S. until 1999, contained many of the features of the Optimus keyboard, including monochrome graphic icons on each keyboard key, macro programming, context-sensitive and application-dependent switching between functions. S. Bigbie et al. published related ideas in an IBM Technical Disclosure Bulletin (Vol. 21 No. 2 July 1978), as did Alan Bagley of Hewlett-Packard in (U.S. patent 4,078,257).

E Ink technology has been used in a product by Sonder Design.

A concept design using E-Ink technology was created by Maxim Mezentsev and Aleksander Suhih in 2013. A similar design by Jaasta was also created in 2014 but was never built since they used Sonder Design's prior art.

== Special features ==
Art. Lebedev Studio manufactured the keyboard with these features:

- A plastic body (width: 537 mm [21 in], depth: 173 mm [7 in], height: 38 mm [1 1/2 in])
- Extra-durable polymer plastic keys (20.2 mm × 20.2 mm [3/4 in × 3/4 in], visible area 10.1 mm × 10.1 mm [3/8 in × 3/8 in])
- 48 × 48 pixel screens, Highcolor mode (65,536 colors, 10 frame/s)
- Organic light-emitting diode screen for keys
- USB 2.0 (or 1.1) connectivity
- 4-5 year lifetime
- A key-saver mode
- Support for animation on keys at 10 frames/s minimum
- Ability to form a mosaic using a combination of key images
- Compatibility with Windows XP, Windows Vista and Mac OS X 10.5.1 (and higher).
- An SDK for complete display customization
- Swappable keys and support for keys without displays
- 32 MB SD card for storing basic layouts
- Non-stop glow time at nominal brightness of 20,000 hours, after which display quality will diminish
- An ambient light sensor which can be used to automatically adjust display brightness
- A viewing angle of 160°

== Name origin ==
The keyboard's full name relates to Jupiter Optimus Maximus ("Father God the Best and Greatest"), the full name of Jupiter, king of the gods in Roman mythology.

== Reviews ==
Engadget published an early impression of the keyboard, approving of the quality of the displays, the build quality of the keyboard, and the customisation software. However, they note that the keys' high resistance means that it is tiring to type on (exhausting the author in "30 seconds to a minute"), and therefore "it's better off used as an absurdly configurable Swiss army knife".

Other reviewers felt that whilst the keyboard performed well, the high purchase price of $1,600 was not justified.
