= Optimus Maximus =

Optimus maximus is Latin for "best [and] greatest". It may refer to:

- Jupiter Optimus Maximus, one of three deities in Rome's Capitoline Triad
- The Temple of Jupiter Optimus Maximus, a temple to that deity in Ancient Rome
- Jupiter Dolichenus also known as Jupiter Optimus Maximus Dolichenus
- The Optimus Maximus keyboard
