= Sonder =

Sonder may refer to:

== Geography ==
- Mount Sonder, mountain in Australia
- Sonder, Minahasa, a district in Minahasa Regency, Indonesia

== People ==
- Otto Wilhelm Sonder (1812–1881), German botanist and pharmacist

== Other uses ==
- Sonder (Dermot Kennedy album), a 2022 album by Irish singer Dermot Kennedy
- Sonder (Tesseract album), a 2018 album by British band Tesseract
- Sonder (band), 2016 band formed by Brent Faiyaz
- Sonder Corp., a former American apartment-hotel company
- Sonder Design, Australian design company
- Sonder-Kfz 1, armoured car used by East German riot police in the 1950s and 1960s
- Sonder, a word invented by John Koenig, see The Dictionary of Obscure Sorrows § Notable words

== See also ==
- Sonderdienst
- Sonderkommando
