= Keyboard protector =

A keyboard protector or keyboard cover is a device which is placed on top of a computer keyboard in order to reduce contact with the environment. Keyboards are susceptible to corrosion damage from liquid spills and build up of dust and debris, requiring frequent cleaning and maintenance. The protector serves as a barrier to eliminate ingress from these materials.

== Composition ==
A keyboard protector is usually made from plastic, polyurethane or silicone. It is in the form of a flexible sheet, moulded to fit the key profiles and arrangements on the keyboard.

== Working principle ==
A keyboard protector is placed on top of a keyboard, acting as a physical barrier to the environment. When a key is depressed, the protector material deforms with the key, allowing full key travel and tactile feedback. Some models have the sides of the protector extend to the underside of the keyboard, which are secured with adhesive tape. When dirty, the protector can be removed and cleaned.

== Advantages and inconvenience ==
Computer users who are unfamiliar with keyboard protectors may take some time to become accustomed, since the keystrokes are dampened and the force needed to depress the keys is different. These factors may also affect their typing speed and accuracy. Some applications can be a disadvantage, for example laptops and luggables. On laptops, the computer may not close properly with the protector fitted, and can transfer dirt and debris to the display.

== Compatibility ==
Since there are several major types of keyboards in the market, some with different layouts, the compatibility of keyboard protectors is also important in order to have the keyboard fully and well protected. Different keyboards will often feature slightly different key spacing or arrangement, leading to ill-fitting protectors.
