= Computer keyboard =

Data input device

Typing on a laptop keyboard

A computer keyboard is a built-in or peripheral input device modeled after the typewriter keyboard which uses an arrangement of buttons or keys to act as mechanical levers or electronic switches. Replacing early punched cards and paper tape technology, interaction via teleprinter-style keyboards have been the main input method for computers since the 1970s, supplemented by the computer mouse since the 1980s, and the touchscreen since the 2000s. Common designs follow a variety of standard keyboard layouts.

Keyboard keys (buttons) typically have a set of characters engraved or printed on them, and each press of a key typically corresponds to a single written symbol. However, producing some symbols may require pressing and holding several keys simultaneously or in sequence. While most keys produce characters (letters, numbers or symbols), other keys (such as the escape key) can prompt the computer to execute system commands. In a modern computer, the interpretation of key presses is generally left to the software: the information sent to the computer, the scan code, tells it only which physical key (or keys) was pressed or released.

In normal usage, the keyboard is used as a text entry interface for typing text, numbers, and symbols into application software such as a word processor, web browser or social media app. Touchscreens use virtual keyboards.

== History ==
Typewriters are the definitive ancestor of all key-based text entry devices, but the computer keyboard as a device for electromechanical data entry and communication largely comes from the utility of two devices: teleprinters (or teletypes) and keypunches. It was through such devices that modern computer keyboards inherited their layouts.

As early as the 1870s, teleprinter-like devices were used to simultaneously type and transmit stock market text data from the keyboard across telegraph lines to stock ticker machines to be immediately copied and displayed onto ticker tape. The teleprinter, in its more contemporary form, was developed from 1907 to 1910 by American mechanical engineer Charles Krum and his son Howard, with early contributions by electrical engineer Frank Pearne. Earlier models were developed separately by individuals such as Royal Earl House and Frederick G. Creed.

Earlier, Herman Hollerith developed the first keypunch devices, which soon evolved to include keys for text and number entry akin to normal typewriters by the 1930s.

The keyboard on the teleprinter played a strong role in point-to-point and point-to-multipoint communication for most of the 20th century, while the keyboard on the keypunch device played a strong role in data entry and storage for just as long. The development of some of the earliest computers incorporated electric typewriter keyboards: the development of the ENIAC computer incorporated a keypunch device as both the input and paper-based output device, and the BINAC computer made use of an electromechanically controlled typewriter for both data entry onto magnetic tape (instead of paper) and data output.

The keyboard remained the primary, most integrated computer peripheral well into the era of personal computing until the introduction of the mouse as a consumer device in 1984. By this time, text-only user interfaces with sparse graphics gave way to comparatively graphics-rich icons on screen. However, keyboards remain central to human-computer interaction to the present though mobile personal computing devices such as smartphones and tablets use a virtual keyboard.

== Types and standards ==
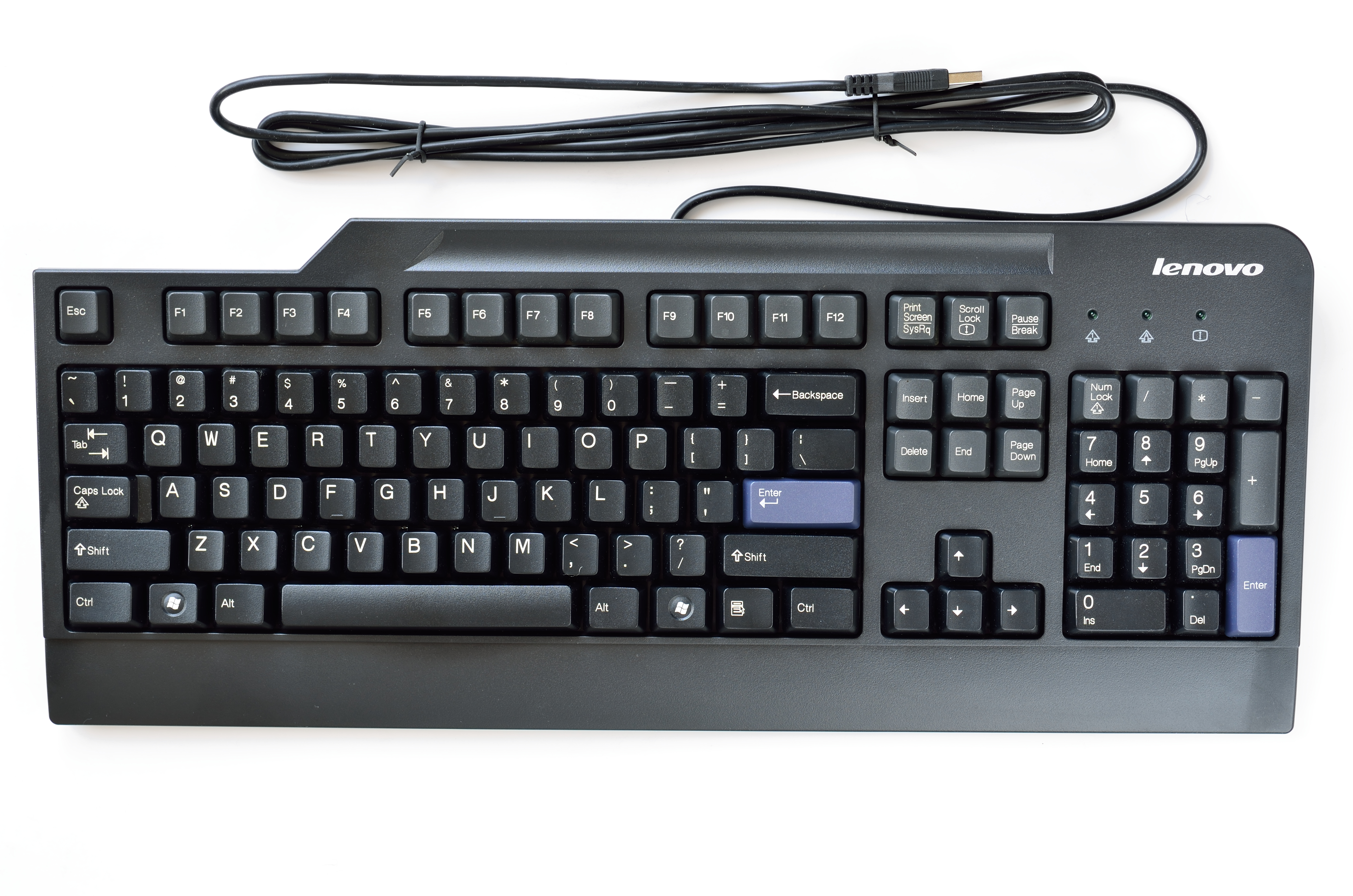
A wired computer keyboard for desktop use manufactured by Lenovo

Different types of keyboards are available and each is designed with a focus on specific features that suit particular needs. Today, most full-size keyboards use one of three different mechanical layouts, usually referred to as simply ISO (ISO/IEC 9995-2), ANSI (ANSI-INCITS 154-1988), and JIS (JIS X 6002-1980), referring roughly to the organizations issuing the relevant worldwide, United States, and Japanese standards, respectively. (In fact, the mechanical layouts referred such as "ISO" and "ANSI" comply to the primary recommendations in the named standards, while each of these standards in fact also allows the other way.) ANSI standard alphanumeric keyboards have keys that are on three-quarter inch centers (0.75 inches (19 mm)), and have a key travel of at least 0.15 inches (3.8 mm).

A size comparison between typical keyboard form factors = compact + = tenkeyless + + = full-size

Modern keyboard models contain a set number of total keys according to their given standard, described as 101, 104, 105, etc. and sold as "Full-size" keyboards. Modern keyboards matching US conventions typically have 104 keys while the 105 key layout is the norm in the rest of the world. This number is not always followed, and individual keys or whole sections are commonly skipped for the sake of compactness or user preference. The most common choice is to not include the numpad, which can usually be fully replaced by the alphanumeric section; such designs are referred to as "tenkeyless" (or TKL). Laptops and wireless peripherals often lack duplicate keys and ones seldom used. Function- and arrow keys are nearly always present.

Another factor determining the size of a keyboard is the size and spacing of the keys. The reduction is limited by the practical consideration that the keys must be large enough to be easily pressed by fingers. Alternatively, a tool is used for pressing small keys.

=== Desktop or full-size ===
Desktop computer keyboards include alphabetic characters and numerals (and usually additionally a numeric keypad), typographical symbols and punctuation marks, one or more currency symbols and other special characters, diacritics and a variety of function keys. The repertoire of glyphs engraved on the keys of a keyboard accords with national conventions and language needs. Computer keyboards are similar to electric-typewriter keyboards but contain additional keys, such as the command key or Windows keys.

=== Laptop-size ===
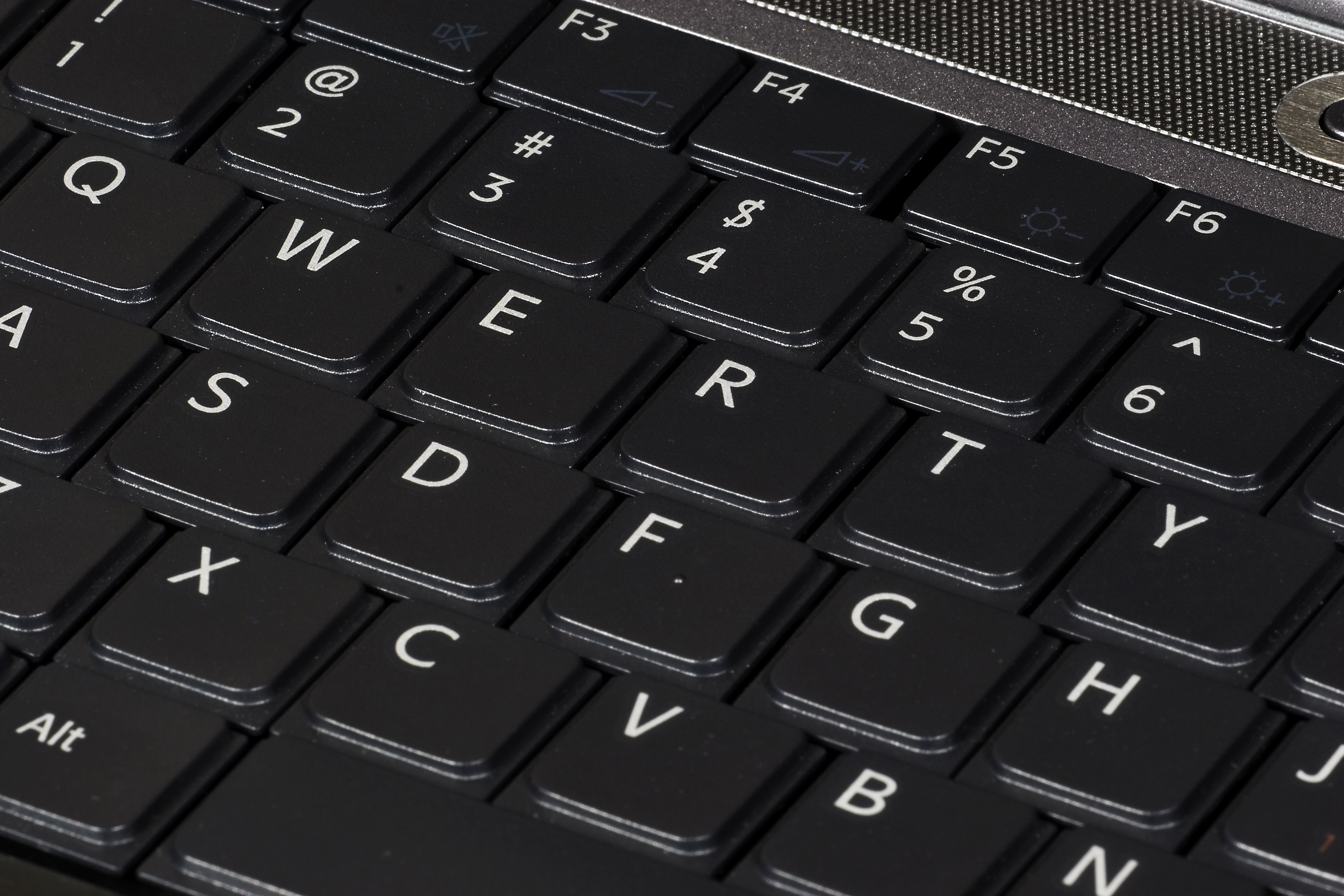
Keyboards on laptops usually have a shorter travel distance and a reduced set of keys.

Keyboards on laptops and notebook computers usually have a shorter travel distance for the keystroke, shorter over travel distance, and a reduced set of keys. They may not have a numeric keypad, and the function keys may be placed in locations that differ from their placement on a standard, full-sized keyboard. The switch mechanism for a laptop keyboard is more likely to be a scissor switch than a rubber dome; this is opposite the trend for full-size keyboards.

=== Flexible keyboards ===
Flexible keyboards are a junction between normal type and laptop type keyboards: normal from the full arrangement of keys, and laptop from the short key distance. Additionally, the flexibility allows the user to fold/roll the keyboard for better storage and transfer. However, for typing the keyboard must be resting on a hard surface. The vast majority of flexible keyboards in the market are made from silicone; this material makes them water- and dust-proof. This is useful in hospitals, where keyboards are subjected to frequent washing, and other dirty or must-be-clean environments.

=== Handheld ===
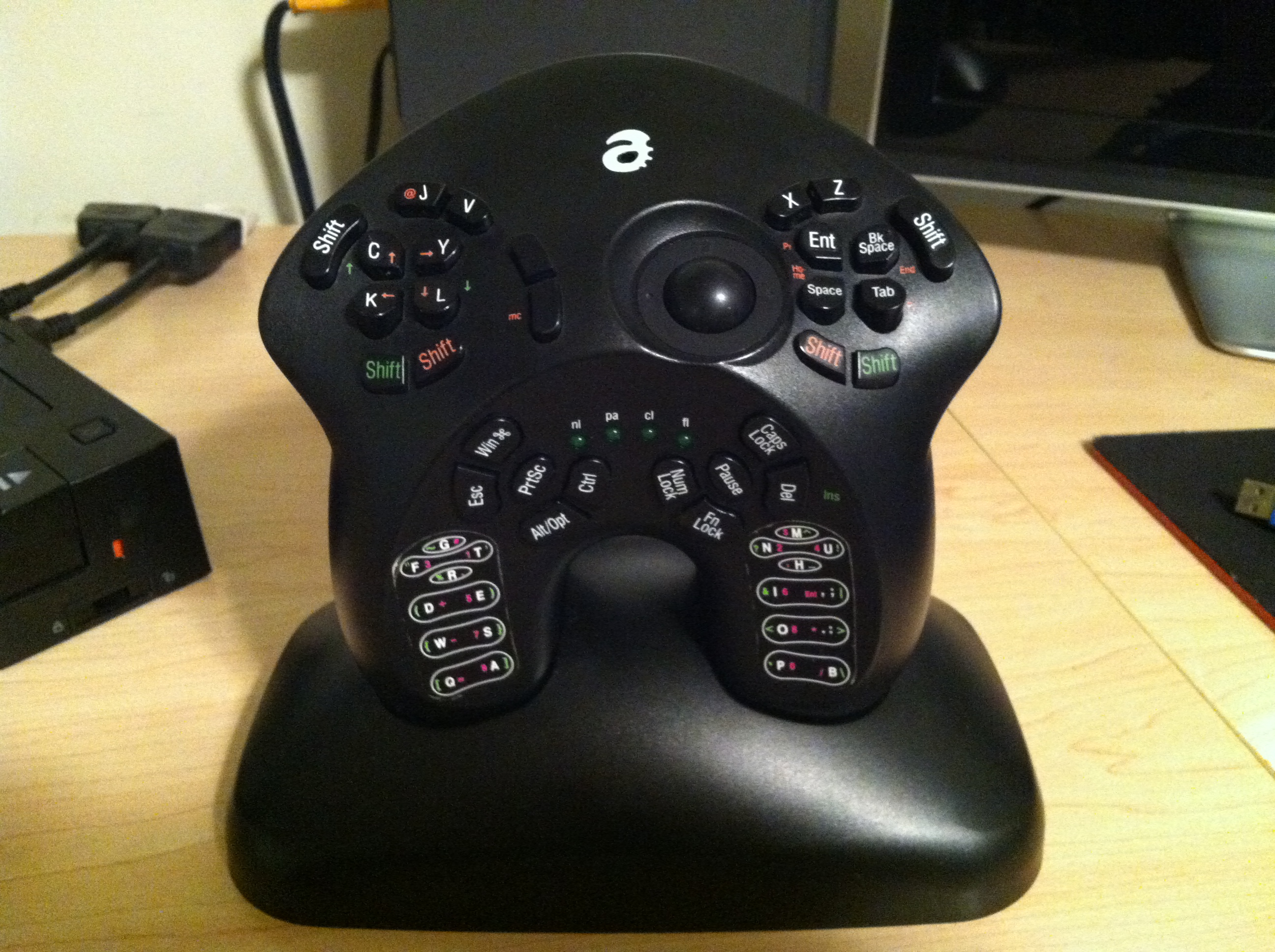
An AlphaGrip handheld keyboard

Handheld ergonomic keyboards are designed to be held like a game controller, and can be used as such, instead of laid out flat on top of a table surface.

Typically handheld keyboards hold all the alphanumeric keys and symbols that a standard keyboard would have, yet only be accessed by pressing two sets of keys at once; one acting as a function key similar to a 'Shift' key that would allow for capital letters on a standard keyboard. Handheld keyboards allow the user the ability to move around a room or to lean back on a chair while also being able to type in front or away from the computer. Some variations of handheld ergonomic keyboards also include a trackball mouse that allow mouse movement and typing included in one handheld device.

=== Thumb-sized ===
Smaller external keyboards have been introduced for devices without a built-in keyboard, such as PDAs, and smartphones. Small keyboards are also useful where there is a limited workspace.

A thumb keyboard (thumb board) is used in some personal digital assistants such as the Palm Treo and BlackBerry and some Ultra-Mobile PCs such as the OQO.

Numeric keyboards contain only numbers, mathematical symbols for addition, subtraction, multiplication, and division, a decimal point, and several function keys. They are often used to facilitate data entry with smaller keyboards that do not have a numeric keypad, commonly those of laptop computers. These keys are collectively known as a numeric pad, numeric keys, or a numeric keypad, and it can consist of the following types of keys: Arithmetic operators, numbers, arrow keys, Navigation keys, Num Lock and Enter key.

=== Multifunctional ===
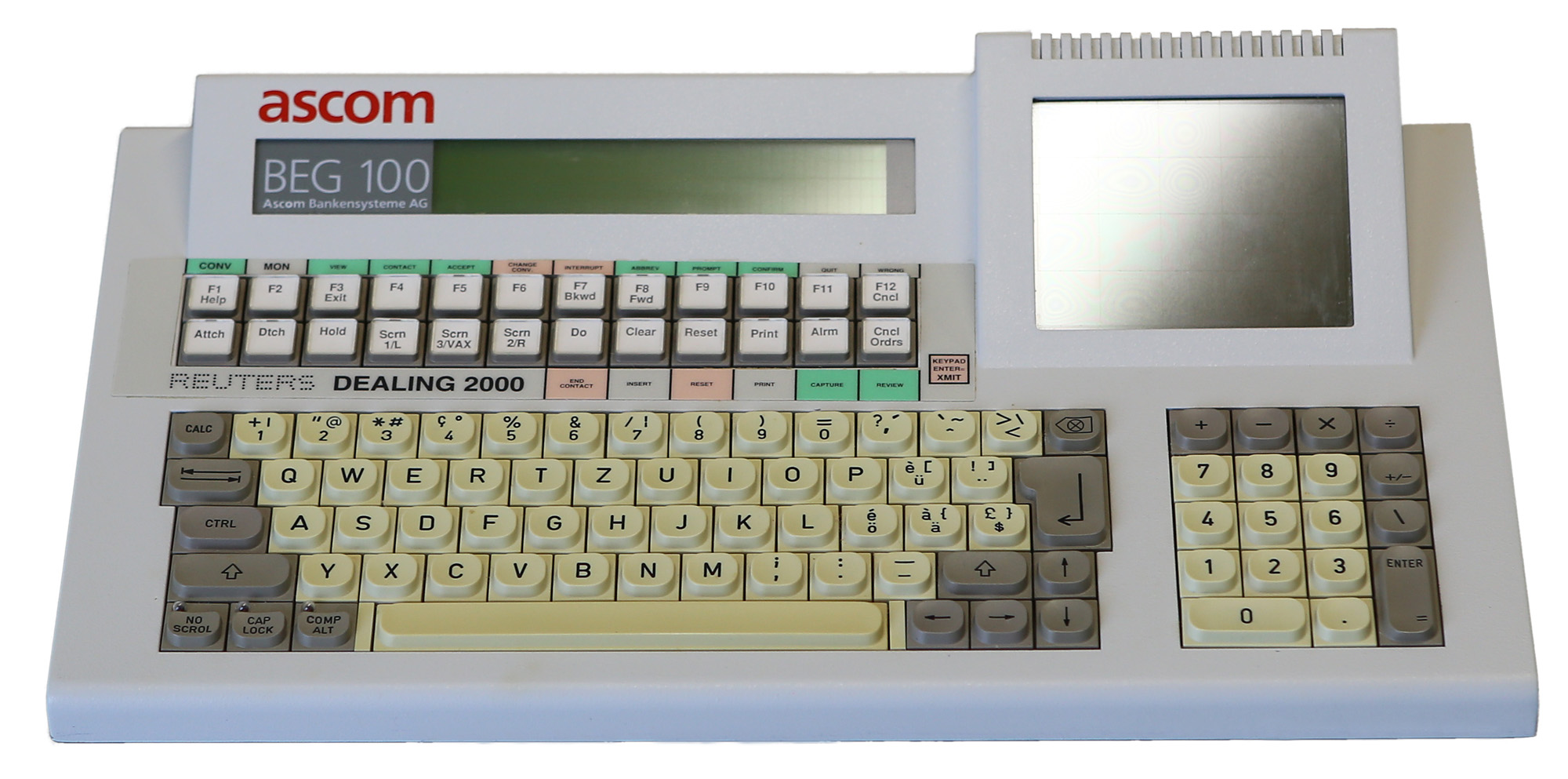
Multifunction keyboard with LCD function keys

Multifunctional keyboards provide additional function beyond the standard keyboard. Many are programmable, configurable computer keyboards and some control multiple PCs, workstations and other information sources, usually in multi-screen work environments. Users have additional key functions as well as the standard functions and can typically use a single keyboard and mouse to access multiple sources.

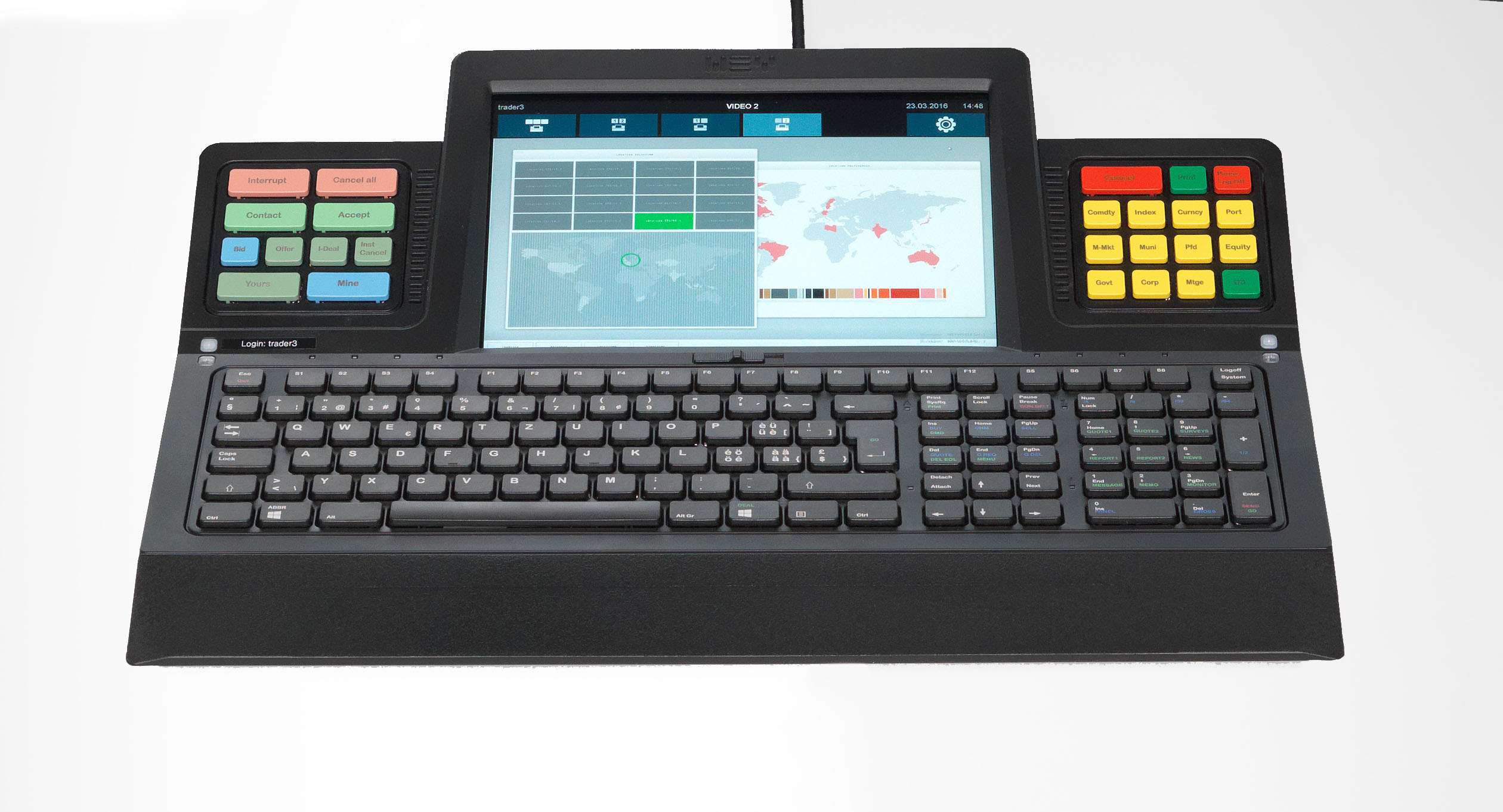
Multifunction keyboard with touch

Multifunctional keyboards may feature customised keypads, fully programmable function or soft keys for macros/pre-sets, biometric or smart card readers, trackballs, etc. New generation multifunctional keyboards feature a touchscreen display to stream video, control audio visual media and alarms, execute application inputs, configure individual desktop environments, etc. Multifunctional keyboards may also permit users to share access to PCs and other information sources. Multiple interfaces (serial, USB, audio, Ethernet, etc.) are used to integrate external devices. Some multifunctional keyboards are also used to directly and intuitively control video walls.

Common environments for multifunctional keyboards are complex, high-performance workplaces for financial traders and control room operators (emergency services, security, air traffic management; industry, utilities management, etc.).

=== Ergonomic keyboards ===
An ergonomic keyboard is one that is designed with ergonomic considerations in mind, to minimize muscle strain, fatigue, and other problems. Ergonomic keyboards, in essence, are created with the aim of minimizing discomfort in users' wrists and reducing unnecessary finger movements by rearranging or repositioning the keys. For instance, typing on a conventional keyboard layout can force the user into shoulder elevation, wrist ulnar deviation, and head rotation. Consideration of physical ergonomics suggests the most relaxed typing position is one in which the keyboard user's forearms are parallel to the ground, with wrists held straight. To facilitate this posture, Klockenberg published a study in 1926 that suggested the primary key clusters for two-handed typists should be split into left and right halves which are set at an angle to each other, allowing the wrists to remain straight. A more detailed study was published in 1972 by Kroemer, suggesting that an adjustable split keyboard may reduce user pain. During the 1970s, several studies were published suggesting that data entry operators were at risk of developing musculoskeletal injuries.

== Non-standard layout and special-use types ==
=== One-handed ===
Some keyboards have been designed for operation with only a single hand. The first one, a chorded keyboard, was invented by Douglas Engelbart. Other examples of one-handed keyboards include the FrogPad, the Half-keyboard, and one-handed Dvorak.

=== Chorded ===
While other keyboards generally associate one action with each key, chorded keyboards associate actions with combinations of key presses. Since there are many combinations available, chorded keyboards can effectively produce more actions on a board with fewer keys. Court reporters' stenotype machines use chorded keyboards to enable them to enter text much faster by typing a syllable with each stroke instead of one letter at a time. The fastest typists (as of 2007) use a stenograph, a kind of chorded keyboard used by most court reporters and closed-caption reporters. Some chorded keyboards are also made for use in situations where fewer keys are preferable, such as on devices that can be used with only one hand, and on small mobile devices that don't have room for larger keyboards. Chorded keyboards are less desirable in many cases because it usually takes practice and memorization of the combinations to become proficient.

=== Virtual ===
Virtual keyboards, sometimes called on-screen keyboards (rarely software keyboards), consist of computer programs that display an image of a keyboard on the screen. Another input device such as a mouse or a touchscreen can be used to operate each virtual key to enter text. Virtual keyboards have become very popular in touchscreen enabled cell phones due to the additional cost and space requirements of other types of hardware keyboards. Microsoft Windows, Mac OS X, and some varieties of Linux include on-screen keyboards that can be controlled with the mouse. In these, the mouse has to be maneuvered onto the on-screen letters given by the software. On the click of a letter, the software writes the respective letter in the respective spot.

=== Projection ===
Projection keyboards project an image of keys, usually with a laser, onto a flat surface. The device then uses a camera or infrared sensor to "watch" where the user's fingers move, and will count a key as being pressed when it "sees" the user's finger touch the projected image. Projection keyboards can simulate a full size keyboard from a very small projector. Because the "keys" are simply projected images, they cannot be felt when pressed. Users of projected keyboards often experience increased discomfort in their fingertips because of the lack of "give" when typing. A flat, non-reflective surface is also required for the keys to be projected. Most projection keyboards are made for use with PDAs and smartphones due to their small form factor.

=== Optical keyboard technology ===
Also known as photo-optical keyboard, light responsive keyboard, photo-electric keyboard and optical key actuation detection technology.

An optical keyboard technology utilizes LEDs and photo sensors to optically detect actuated keys. Most commonly the emitters and sensors are located in the perimeter, mounted on a small PCB. The light is directed from side to side of the keyboard interior and it can only be blocked by the actuated keys. Most optical keyboards require at least 2 beams (most commonly vertical beam and horizontal beam) to determine the actuated key. Some optical keyboards use a special key structure that blocks the light in a certain pattern, allowing only one beam per row of keys (most commonly horizontal beam).

== Key types ==
=== Alphanumeric ===
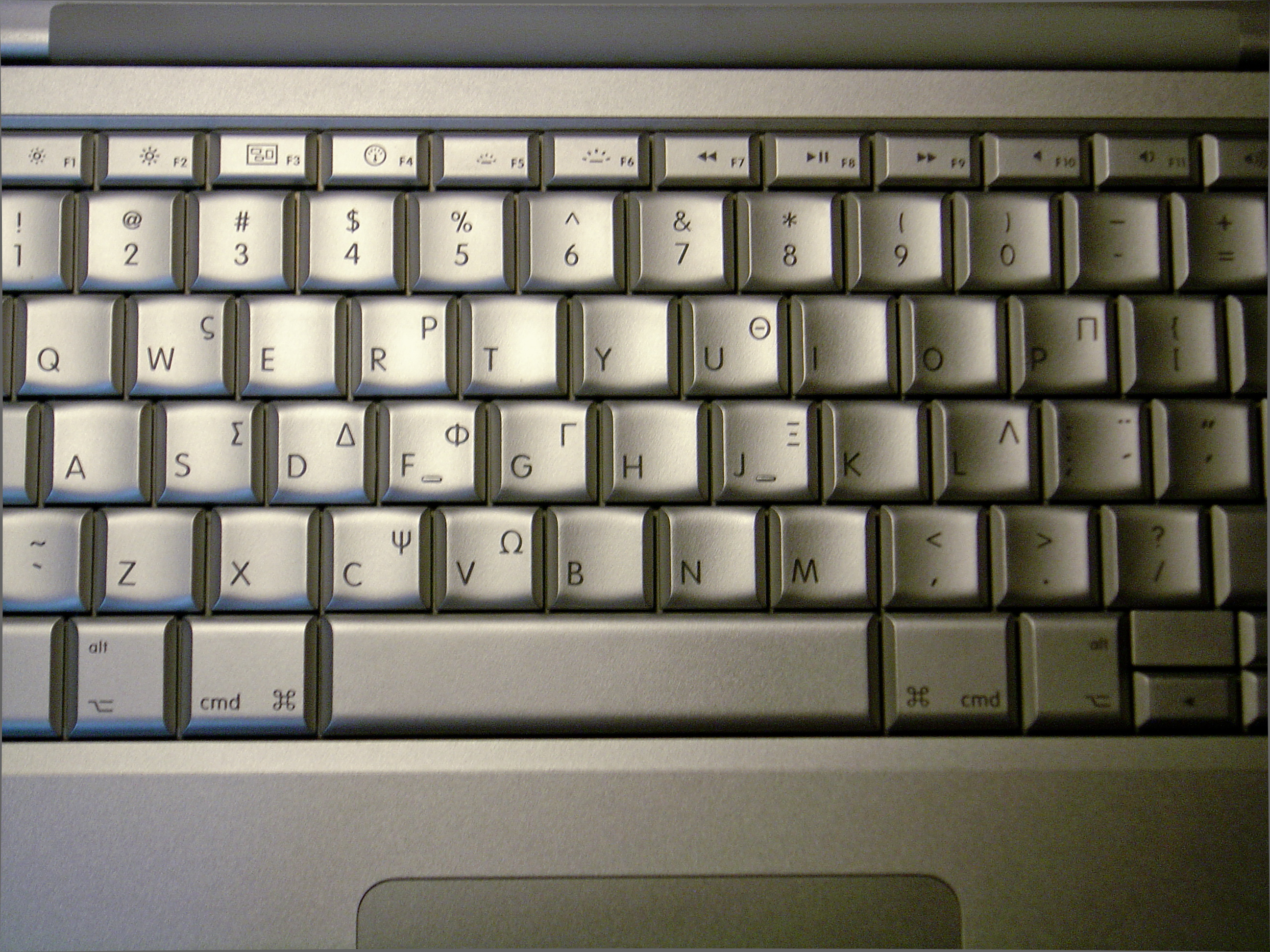
A Greek keyboard lets the user type in both Greek and the Latin alphabet (MacBook Pro).

Alphabetical, numeric, and punctuation keys are used in the same fashion as a typewriter keyboard to enter their respective symbol into a word processing program, text editor, data spreadsheet, or other program. Many of these keys will produce different symbols when modifier keys or shift keys are pressed. The alphabetic characters become uppercase when the ⇧ Shift key or ⇪ Caps Lock key is depressed. The numeric characters become symbols or punctuation marks when the ⇧ Shift key is depressed. The alphabetical, numeric, and punctuation keys can also have other functions when they are pressed at the same time as some modifier keys.

The Space bar is a horizontal bar in the lowermost row, which is significantly wider than other keys. Like the alphanumeric characters, it is also descended from the mechanical typewriter. Its main purpose is to enter the space between words during typing. It is large enough so that a thumb from either hand can use it easily. Depending on the operating system, when the space bar is used with a modifier key such as the control key, it may have functions such as resizing or closing the current window, half-spacing, or backspacing. In computer games and other applications the key has myriad uses in addition to its normal purpose in typing, such as jumping and adding marks to check boxes. In certain programs for playback of digital video, the space bar is used for pausing and resuming the playback.

=== Modifier keys ===
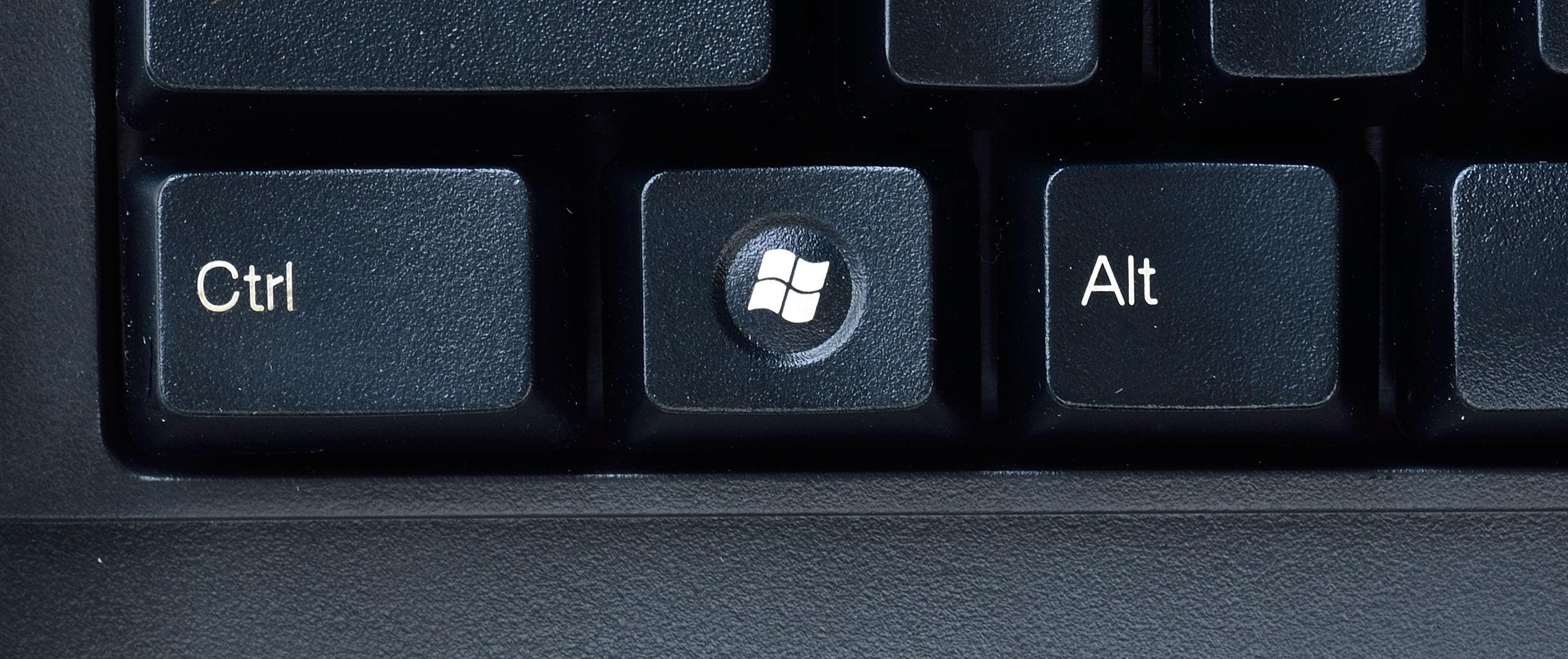
The Control, Windows, and Alt keys are important modifier keys.

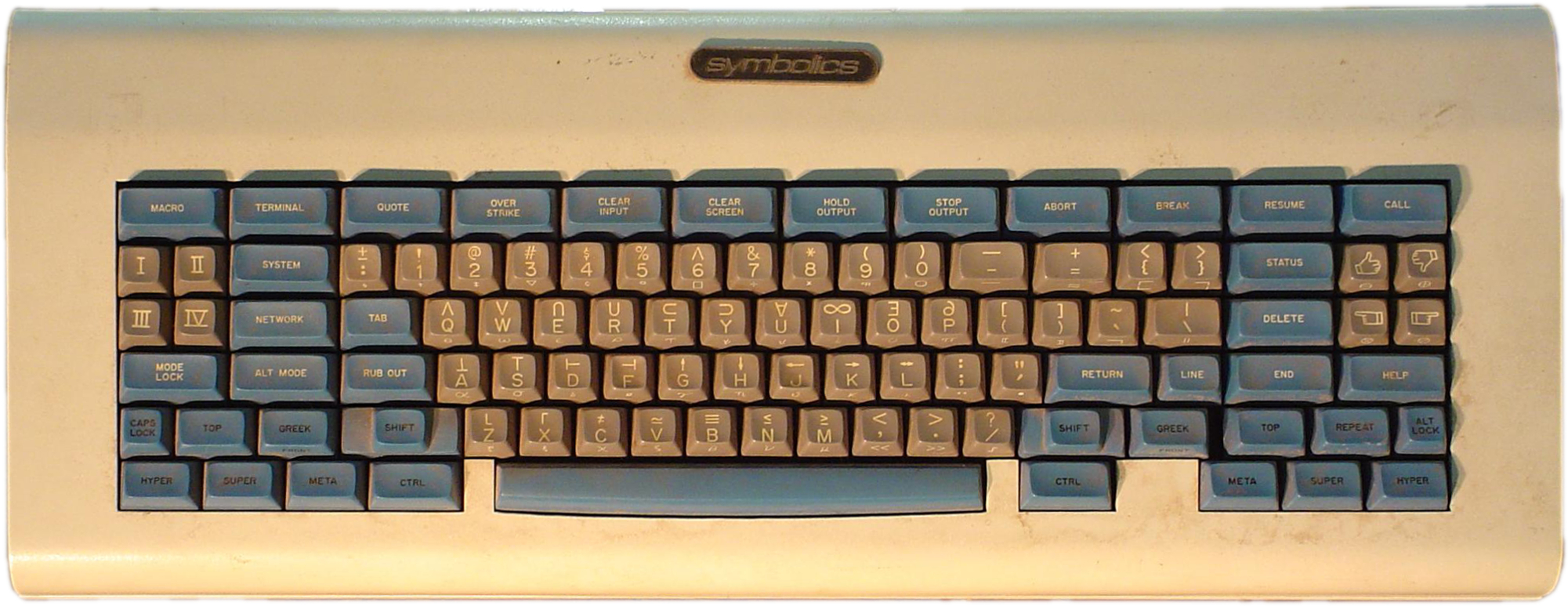
A space-cadet keyboard has many modifier keys.

Modifier keys are special keys that modify the normal action of another key, when the two are pressed in combination. For example, Alt+F4 in Microsoft Windows will close the program in an active window. In contrast, pressing just F4 will probably do nothing, unless assigned a specific function in a particular program. By themselves, modifier keys usually do nothing.

The most widely used modifier keys include the Ctrl, ⇧ Shift and Alt keys. The AltGr key is used to access additional symbols for keys that have three symbols printed on them. On the Macintosh and Apple keyboards, the modifier keys are the ⌥ Option and ⌘ Command keys, respectively. On Sun Microsystems and Lisp machine keyboards, the ◆ Meta and ❖ Super keys are used as a modifier, and for Windows keyboards there is a ⊞ Windows key. Compact keyboard layouts often use a Fn key. "Dead keys" allow placement of a diacritic mark, such as an accent, on the following letter (e.g., the Compose key).

The ⌅ Enter/↵ Return typically causes a command line, window form or dialog box to operate its default function, which is typically to finish an "entry" and begin the desired process. In word processing applications, pressing the enter key ends a paragraph and starts a new one.

=== Cursor keys ===
Navigation keys or cursor keys include a variety of keys which move the cursor to different positions on the screen. Arrow keys (↑, ↓, ←, →) are programmed to move the cursor in a specified direction; page scroll keys, such as the Page Up and Page Down keys, scroll the page up and down. The Home key is used to return the cursor to the beginning of the line where the cursor is located; the End key puts the cursor at the end of the line. The Tab ↹ key advances the cursor to the next tab stop. The Insert key is mainly used to switch between overtype mode, in which the cursor overwrites any text that is present on and after its current location, and insert mode, where the cursor inserts a character at its current position, forcing all characters past it one position further. The Delete key discards the character ahead of the cursor's position, moving all following characters one position "back" towards the freed place. On many notebook computer keyboards the key labeled Delete (sometimes Delete and Backspace are printed on the same key) serves the same purpose as a Backspace key. The ← Backspace key deletes the preceding character. Lock keys lock part of a keyboard, depending on the settings selected. The lock keys are scattered around the keyboard. Most styles of keyboards have three LEDs indicating which locks are enabled, in the upper right corner above the numeric pad. The lock keys include Scroll Lock, Num Lock (which allows the use of the numeric keypad), and ⇪ Caps Lock.

=== System commands ===
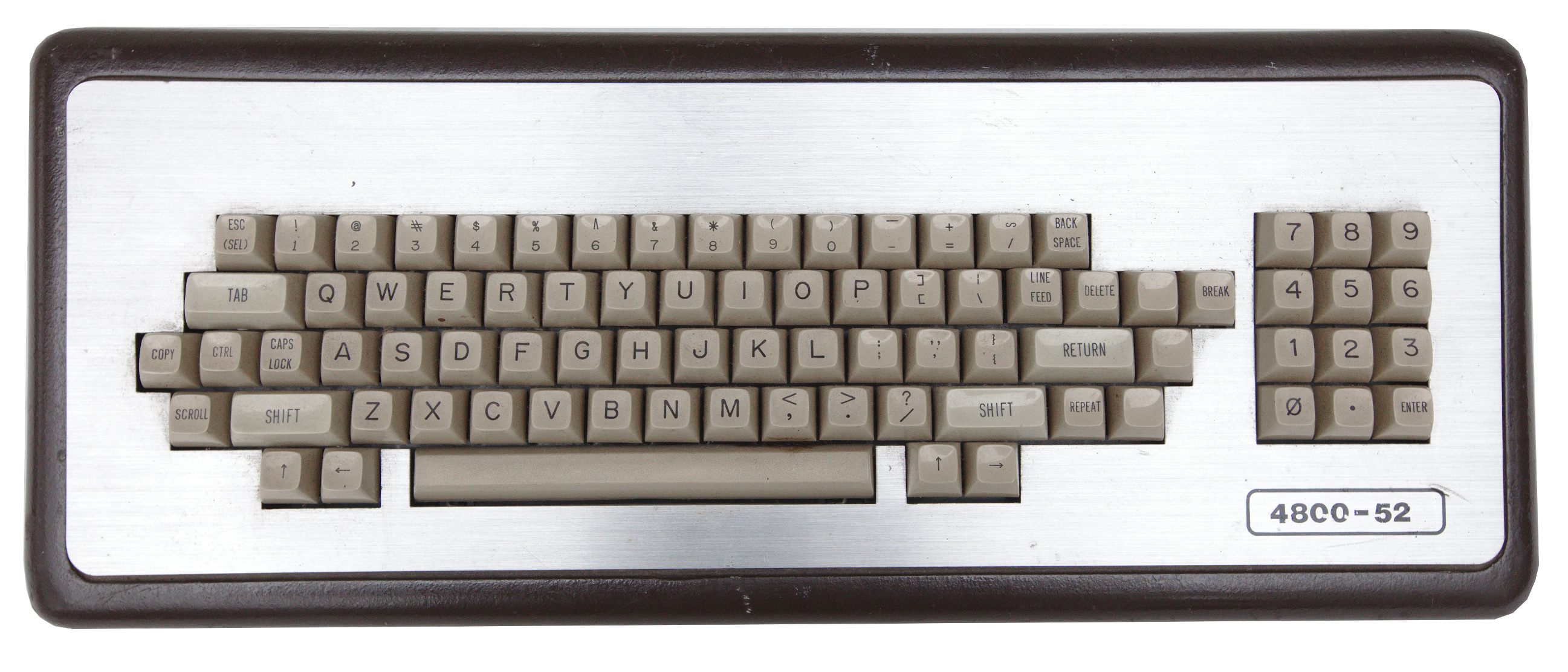
4800-52 mainframe / dumb terminal keyboard, circa mid 1980s. Note the obscure configuration of modifier and arrow keys, line feed key, break key, blank keys, and repeat key.

The Print Screen/SysRq commands often share the same key. SysRq was used in earlier computers as a "panic" button to recover from crashes (and it is still used in this sense to some extent by the Linux kernel; see Magic SysRq key). The Print screen command used to capture the entire screen and send it to the printer, but in the present it usually puts a screenshot in the clipboard.

==== Break key ====
The Pause/Break key no longer has a well-defined purpose. Its origins go back to teleprinter users, who wanted a key that would temporarily interrupt the communications line. The Break key can be used by software in several different ways, such as to switch between multiple login sessions, to terminate a program, or to interrupt a modem connection. In programming, especially old DOS-style BASIC, Pascal and C, Break is used (in conjunction with Ctrl) to stop program execution. In addition to this, Linux and variants, as well as many DOS programs, treat this combination the same as Ctrl+C. On modern keyboards, the break key is usually labeled Pause/Break. In most Windows environments, the key combination Windows key+Pause brings up the system properties.

==== Escape key ====
The Esc key has a variety of meanings according to Operating System, application or both. "Nearly all of the time", it signals Stop, QUIT, or "let me get out of a dialog" (or pop-up window). It triggers the Stop function in many web browsers.

The escape key was part of the standard keyboard of the Teletype Model 33 (introduced in 1964 and used with many early minicomputers). The DEC VT50, introduced July 1974, also had an Esc key. The TECO text editor (ca 1963) and its descendant Emacs (ca 1985) use the Esc key extensively.

Historically it also served as a type of shift key, such that one or more following characters were interpreted differently, hence the term escape sequence, which refers to a series of characters, usually preceded by the escape character.

On machines running Microsoft Windows, prior to the implementation of the Windows key on keyboards, the typical practice for invoking the "start" button was to hold down the control key and press escape. This process still works in Windows 95, 98, Me, NT 4, 2000, XP, Vista, 7, 8, and 10.

==== Enter or Return key ====
The ⌅ Enter and ↵ Return keys are two closely related keys with overlapping and distinct functions dependent on operating system and application. On full-size keyboards, there are two such keys, one in the alphanumeric keys and the other one is in the numeric keys. The purpose of the enter key is to confirm what has been typed. The return key is based on the original line feed/carriage return function of typewriters: in many word processors, for example, the return key ends a paragraph; in a spreadsheet, it completes the current cell and move to the next cell.

The shape of the Enter key differs between ISO and ANSI keyboards: in the latter, the Enter key is in a single row (usually the third from the bottom) while in the former it spans over two rows and has an inverse L shape.

==== Shift key ====
The purpose of the ⇧ Shift key is to invoke the first alternative function of the key with which it is pressed concurrently. For alphabetic keys, shift+letter gives the upper case version of that letter. For other keys, the key is engraved with symbols for both the unshifted and shifted result. When used in combination with other control keys (such as Ctrl, Alt or AltGr), the effect is system and application dependent.

==== Menu key ====
The ≣ Menu or Application key is found on Windows-oriented computer keyboards. It is used to launch a context menu with the keyboard rather than with the usual right mouse button. The key's symbol is usually a small icon depicting a cursor hovering above a menu. On some Samsung keyboards the cursor in the icon is not present, showing the menu only. This key was created at the same time as the Windows key. This key is normally used when the right mouse button is not present on the mouse. Some Windows public terminals do not have a Menu key on their keyboard to prevent users from right-clicking (however, in many Windows applications, a similar functionality can be invoked with the Shift+F10 keyboard shortcut).

=== Number pad ===
Many, but not all, computer keyboards have a numeric keypad to the right of the alphabetic keyboard, often separated from the other groups of keys such as the function keys and system command keys, which contains numbers, basic mathematical symbols (e.g., addition, subtraction, etc.), and a few function keys. In addition to the row of number keys above the top alphabetic row, most desktop keyboards have a number pad or accounting pad, on the right hand side of the keyboard. While num lock is set, the numbers on these keys duplicate the number row; if not, they have alternative functions as engraved. In addition to numbers, this pad has command symbols concerned with calculations such as addition, subtraction, multiplication and division symbols. The enter key in this keys indicate the equal sign.

=== Miscellaneous ===
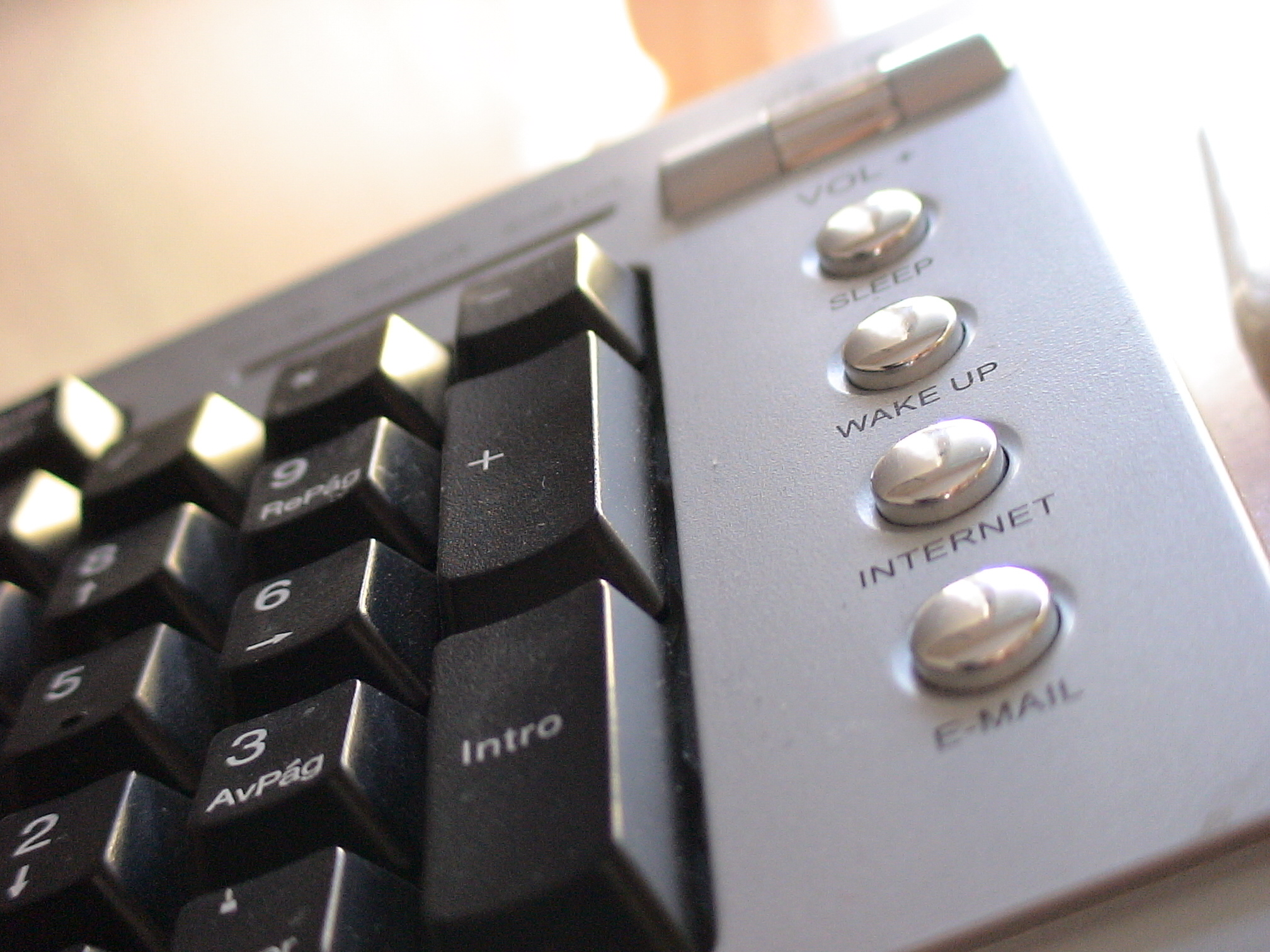
Multimedia buttons on some keyboards give quick access to the Internet or control the volume of the speakers.

On Japanese/Korean keyboards, there may be language input keys for changing the language to use.

Some keyboards have power management keys (e.g., power key, sleep key and wake key); Internet keys to access a web browser or e-mail; and/or multimedia keys, such as volume controls; or keys that can be programmed by the user to launch a specified application or a command like minimizing all windows.

=== Multiple layouts ===
It is possible to install multiple keyboard layouts within an operating system and switch between them, either through features implemented within the OS, or through an external application. Microsoft Windows, Linux, and Mac provide support to add keyboard layouts and choose from them.

== Illumination ==
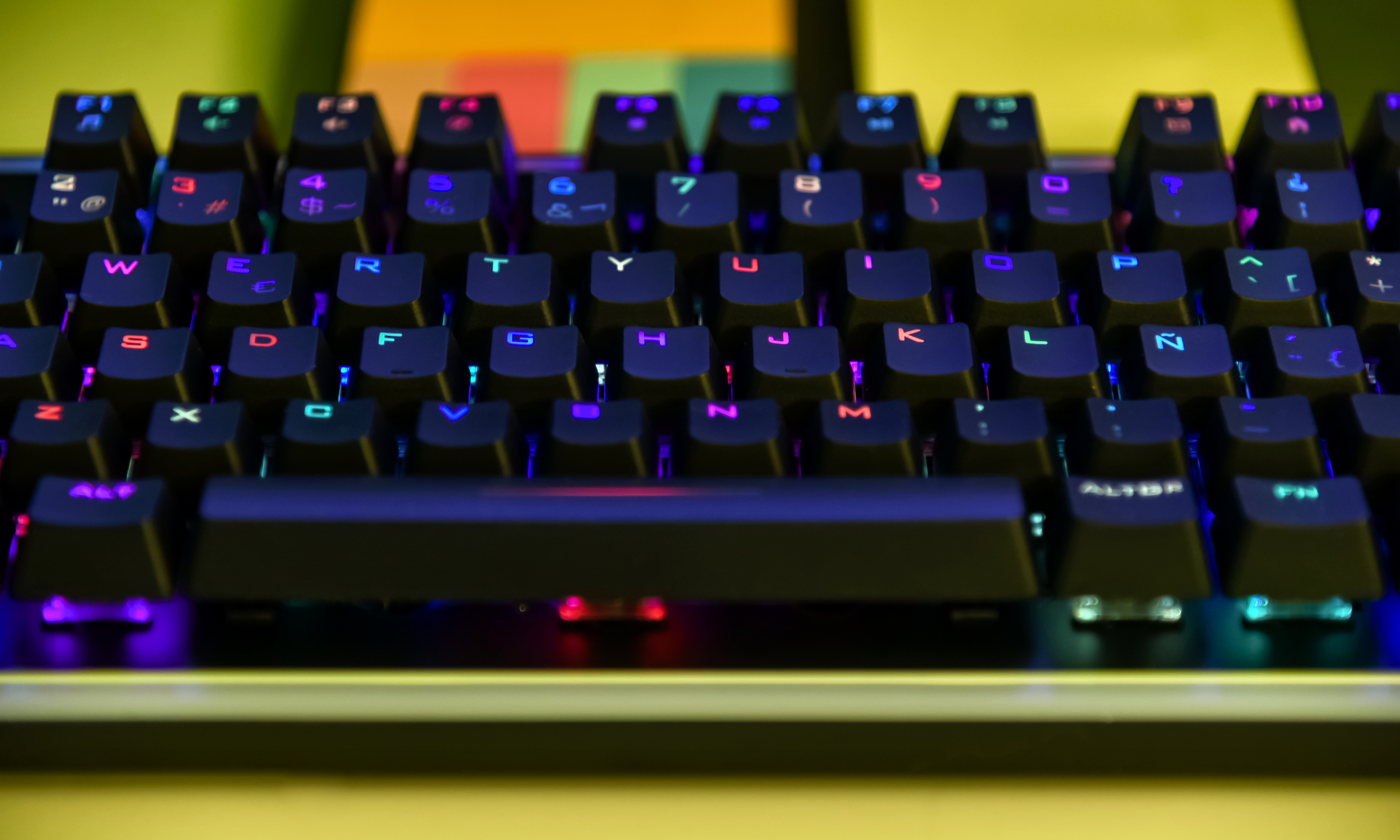
Backlit mechanical keyboard

Keyboards and keypads may be illuminated from inside, especially on equipment for mobile use. Both keyboards built into computers and external ones may support backlighting; external backlit keyboards may have a wired USB connection, or be connected wirelessly and powered by batteries. Illumination facilitates the use of the keyboard or keypad in dark environments.

For general productivity, only the keys may be uniformly backlit, without distracting light around the keys.

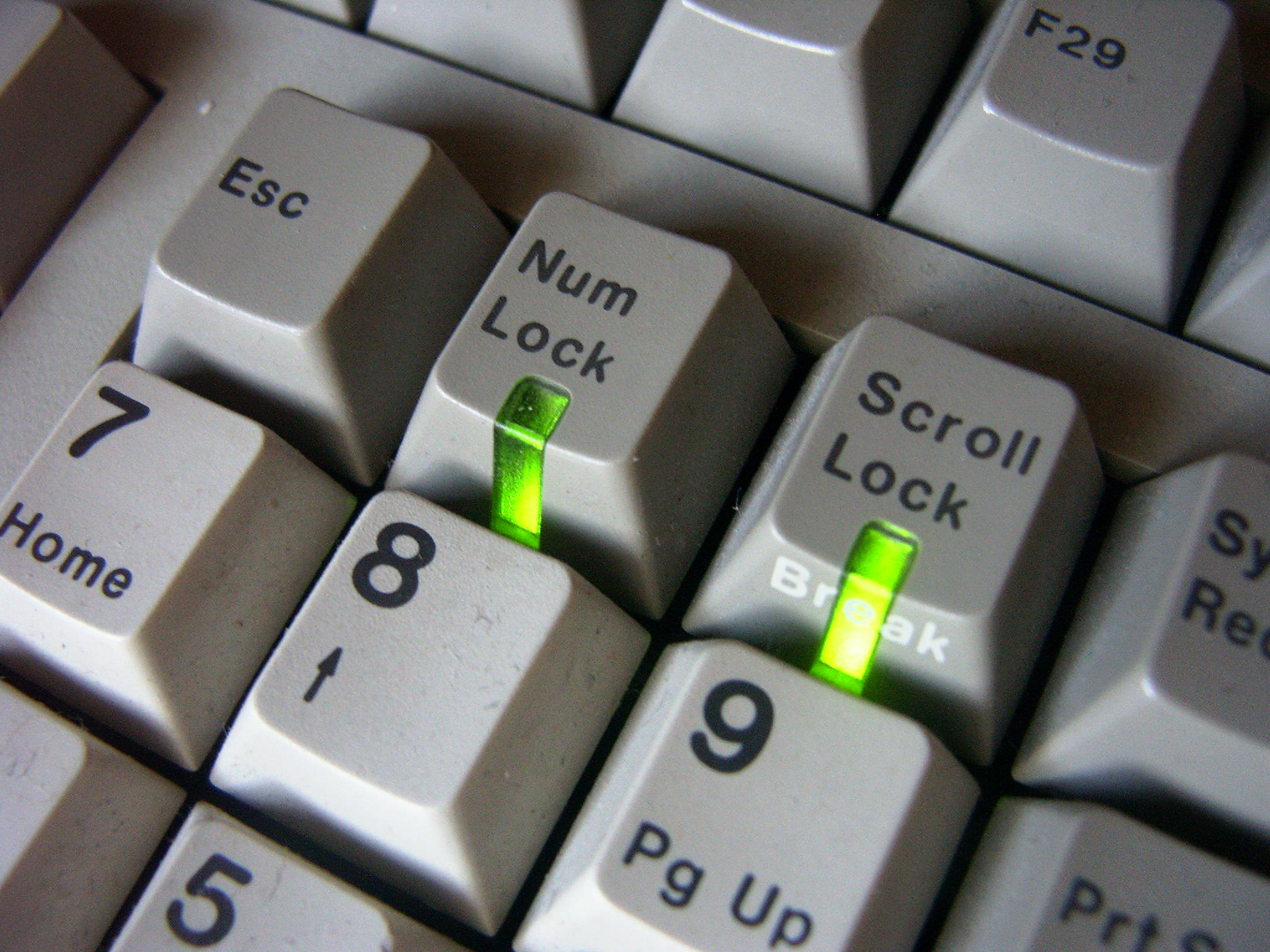
Keys with integrated LED indicator lights

Many gaming keyboards are designed to have an aesthetic as well as functional appeal, with multiple colours, and colour-coded keys to make it easier for gamers to find command keys while playing in a dark room. Many keyboards not otherwise illuminated may have small LED indicator lights in a few important function keys, or elsewhere on the housing, if their function is activated (see photo).

It is possible to make keyboards with oled or LCD screens on the keys. An example is the Optimus Maximus keyboard which has OLED keys. Some keyboards can have separate screens for various purposes, including showing a chat window, game information or other information.

== Technology ==
=== Key switches ===
In the first electronic keyboards in the early 1970s, the key switches were individual switches inserted into holes in metal frames. These keyboards cost from 80 to 120 USD and were used in mainframe data terminals. The most popular switch types were reed switches (contacts enclosed in a vacuum in a glass capsule, affected by a magnet mounted on the switch plunger).

In the mid-1970s, lower-cost direct-contact key switches were introduced, but their life in switch cycles was much shorter (rated ten million cycles) because they were open to the environment. This became more acceptable, however, for use in computer terminals at the time, which began to see increasingly shorter model lifespans as they advanced.

In 1978, Key Tronic Corporation introduced keyboards with capacitive-based switches, one of the first keyboard technologies not to use self-contained switches. There was simply a sponge pad with a conductive-coated Mylar plastic sheet on the switch plunger, and two half-moon trace patterns on the printed circuit board below. As the key was depressed, the capacitance between the plunger pad and the patterns on the PCB below changed, which was detected by integrated circuits (IC). These keyboards were claimed to have the same reliability as the other "solid-state switch" keyboards such as inductive and Hall-effect, but competitive with direct-contact keyboards. Prices of $60 for keyboards were achieved, and Key Tronic rapidly became the largest independent keyboard manufacturer.

Meanwhile, IBM made their own keyboards, using their own patented technology: Keys on older IBM keyboards were made with a "buckling spring" mechanism, in which a coil spring under the key buckles under pressure from the user's finger, triggering a hammer that presses two plastic sheets (membranes) with conductive traces together, completing a circuit. This produces a clicking sound and gives physical feedback for the typist, indicating that the key has been depressed.

The first electronic keyboards had a typewriter key travel distance of 0.187 inches (4.75 mm), keytops were a half-inch (12.7 mm) high, and keyboards were about two inches (5 cm) thick. Over time, less key travel was accepted in the market, finally landing on 0.110 inches (2.79 mm). Coincident with this, Key Tronic was the first company to introduce a keyboard that was only about one inch thick. And now keyboards measure only about a half-inch thick.

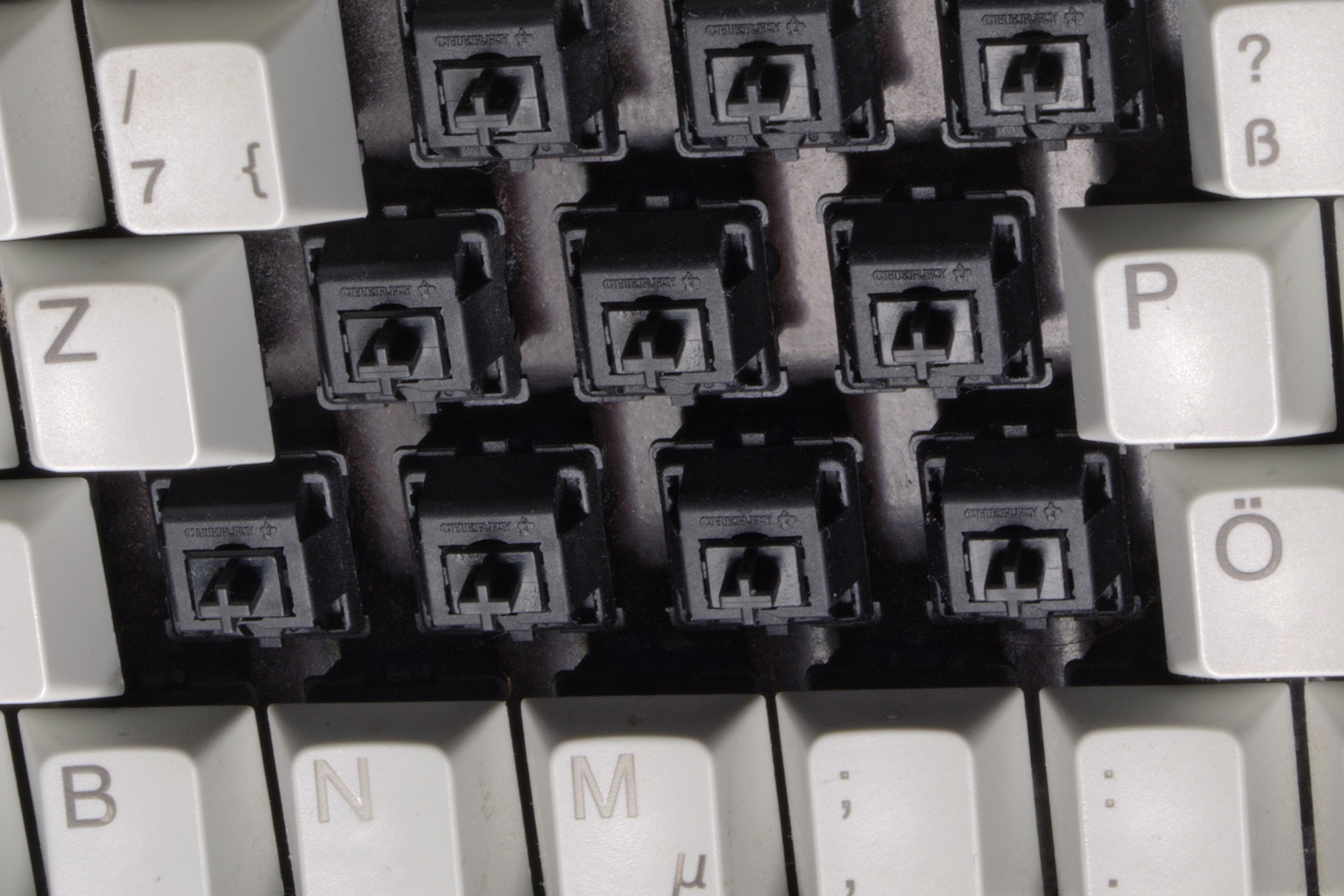
Keyboard with some keytops removed to show the Cherry MX "Black" switches it is based on. MX switches are a common choice for mechanical keyboards.

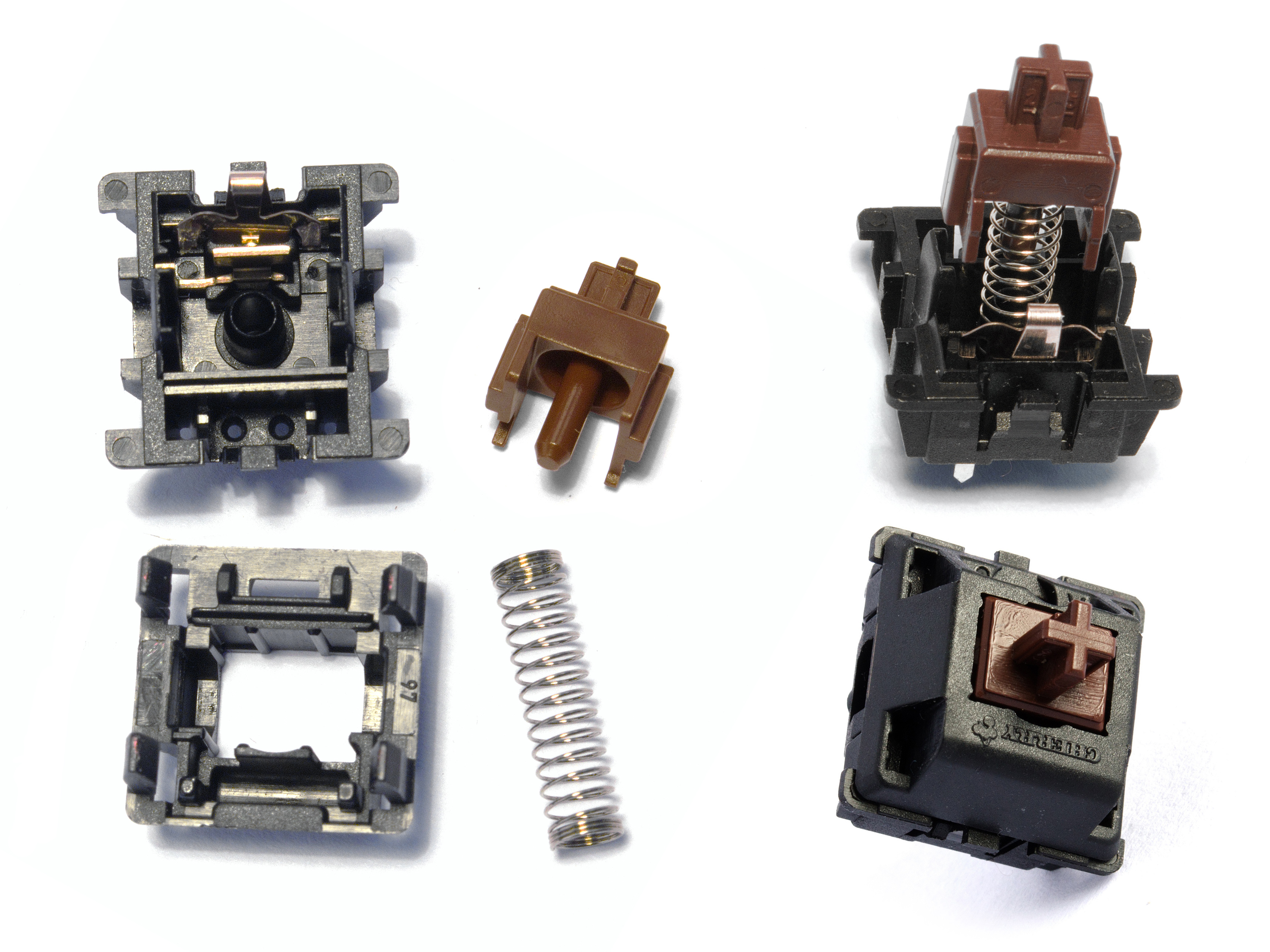
The tactile, non-clicky "brown" version of the Cherry MX switch shown in disassembled form (four parts, left and centre), with the top off (top right) and reassembled (bottom right)

Keytops are an important element of keyboards. In the beginning, keyboard keytops had a "dish shape" on top, like typewriters before them. Keyboard key legends must be extremely durable over tens of millions of depressions, since they are subjected to extreme mechanical wear from fingers and fingernails, and subject to hand oils and creams, so engraving and filling key legends with paint, as was done previously for individual switches, was never acceptable. So, for the first electronic keyboards, the key legends were produced by two-shot (or double-shot, or two-color) molding, where either the key shell or the inside of the key with the key legend was molded first, and then the other color molded second. But, to save cost, other methods were explored, such as sublimation printing and laser engraving, both methods which could be used to print a whole keyboard at the same time.

Initially, sublimation printing, where a special ink is printed onto the keycap surface and the application of heat causes the ink molecules to penetrate and commingle with the plastic modules, had a problem because finger oils caused the molecules to disperse, but then a necessarily very hard clear coating was applied to prevent this. Coincident with sublimation printing, which was first used in high volume by IBM on their keyboards, was the introduction by IBM of single-curved-dish keycaps to facilitate quality printing of key legends by having a consistently curved surface instead of a dish. But one problem with sublimation or laser printing was that the processes took too long and only dark legends could be printed on light-colored keys. On another note, IBM was unique in using separate shells, or "keycaps", on keytop bases. This might have made their manufacturing of different keyboard layouts more flexible, but the reason for doing this was that the plastic material that needed to be used for sublimation printing was different from standard ABS keytop plastic material.

Three final mechanical technologies brought keyboards to where they are today, driving the cost well under $10:

1. "Monoblock" keyboard designs were developed where individual switch housings were eliminated and a one-piece "monoblock" housing used instead. This was possible because of molding techniques that could provide very tight tolerances for the switch-plunger holes and guides across the width of the keyboard so that the key plunger-to-housing clearances were not too tight or too loose, either of which could cause the keys to bind.
2. The use of contact-switch membrane sheets under the monoblock. This technology came from flat-panel switch membranes, where the switch contacts are printed inside of a top and bottom layer, with a spacer layer in between, so that when pressure is applied to the area above, a direct electrical contact is made. The membrane layers can be printed by very-high volume, low-cost "reel-to-reel" printing machines, with each keyboard membrane cut and punched out afterwards.

Plastic materials played a very important part in the development and progress of electronic keyboards. Until "monoblocks" came along, GE's "self-lubricating" Delrin was the only plastic material for keyboard switch plungers that could withstand the beating over tens of millions of cycles of lifetime use. Greasing or oiling switch plungers was undesirable because it would attract dirt over time which would eventually affect the feel and even bind the key switches (although keyboard manufacturers would sometimes sneak this into their keyboards, especially if they could not control the tolerances of the key plungers and housings well enough to have a smooth key depression feel or prevent binding). But Delrin was only available in black and white, and was not suitable for keytops (too soft), so keytops use ABS plastic. However, as plastic molding advanced in maintaining tight tolerances, and as key travel length reduced from 0.187-inch to 0.110-inch (4.75 mm to 2.79 mm), single-part keytop/plungers could be made of ABS, with the keyboard monoblocks also made of ABS.

In common use, the term "mechanical keyboard" refers to a keyboard with individual mechanical key switches, each of which contains a fully encased plunger with a spring below it and metallic electrical contacts on a side. The plunger sits on the spring, and the key will often close the contacts when the plunger is pressed halfway. Other switches require the plunger to be fully pressed down. The depth at which the plunger must be pressed for the contacts to close is known as the activation distance. Analog keyboards with key switches whose activation distance can be reconfigured through software, optical switches that work by blocking laser beams, and Hall Effect keyboards that use key switches that use a magnet to activate a hall sensor are also available.

Some keyboards, called pressure-sensitive, allow varying input according to the distance pressed, analogously to the analog joystick.

=== Control processor ===
Scanning procedure

Computer keyboards include control circuitry to convert key presses into key codes (usually scancodes) that the computer's electronics can understand. The key switches are connected via the printed circuit board in an electrical X-Y matrix where a voltage is provided sequentially to the Y lines and, when a key is depressed, detected sequentially by scanning the X lines.

The first computer keyboards were for mainframe computer data terminals and used discrete electronic parts. The first keyboard microprocessor was introduced in 1972 by General Instruments, but keyboards have been using the single-chip 8048 microcontroller variant since it became available in 1978. The keyboard switch matrix is wired to its inputs, it converts the keystrokes to key codes, and, for a detached keyboard, sends the codes down a serial cable (the keyboard cord) to the main processor on the computer motherboard. This serial keyboard cable communication is only bi-directional to the extent that the computer's electronics controls the illumination of the caps lock, num lock and scroll lock lights.

One test for whether the computer has crashed is pressing the caps lock key. The keyboard sends the key code to the keyboard driver running in the main computer; if the main computer is operating, it commands the light to turn on. All the other indicator lights work in a similar way. The keyboard driver also tracks the Shift, alt and control state of the keyboard.

Some lower-quality keyboards have multiple or false key entries due to inadequate electrical designs. These are caused by inadequate keyswitch "debouncing" or inadequate keyswitch matrix layout that don't allow multiple keys to be depressed at the same time, both circumstances which are explained below:

When pressing a keyboard key, the key contacts may "bounce" against each other for several milliseconds before they settle into firm contact. When released, they bounce some more until they revert to the uncontacted state. If the computer were watching for each pulse, it would see many keystrokes for what the user thought was just one. To resolve this problem, the processor in a keyboard (or computer) "debounces" the keystrokes, by aggregating them across time to produce one "confirmed" keystroke.

Some low-quality keyboards also suffer problems with rollover (that is, when multiple keys pressed at the same time, or when keys are pressed so fast that multiple keys are down within the same milliseconds). Early "solid-state" keyswitch keyboards did not have this problem because the keyswitches are electrically isolated from each other, and early "direct-contact" keyswitch keyboards avoided this problem by having isolation diodes for every keyswitch. These early keyboards had "n-key" rollover, which means any number of keys can be depressed and the keyboard will still recognize the next key depressed. But when three keys are pressed (electrically closed) at the same time in a "direct contact" keyswitch matrix that doesn't have isolation diodes, the keyboard electronics can see a fourth "phantom" key which is the intersection of the X and Y lines of the three keys. Some types of keyboard circuitry will register a maximum number of keys at one time. "Three-key" rollover, also called "phantom key blocking" or "phantom key lockout", will only register three keys and ignore all others until one of the three keys is lifted. This is undesirable, especially for fast typing (hitting new keys before the fingers can release previous keys), and games (designed for multiple key presses).

As direct-contact membrane keyboards became popular, the available rollover of keys was optimized by analyzing the most common key sequences and placing these keys so that they do not potentially produce phantom keys in the electrical key matrix (for example, simply placing three or four keys that might be depressed simultaneously on the same X or same Y line, so that a phantom key intersection/short cannot happen), so that blocking a third key usually isn't a problem. But lower-quality keyboard designs and unknowledgeable engineers may not know these tricks, and it can still be a problem in games due to wildly different or configurable layouts in different games.

=== Connection types ===
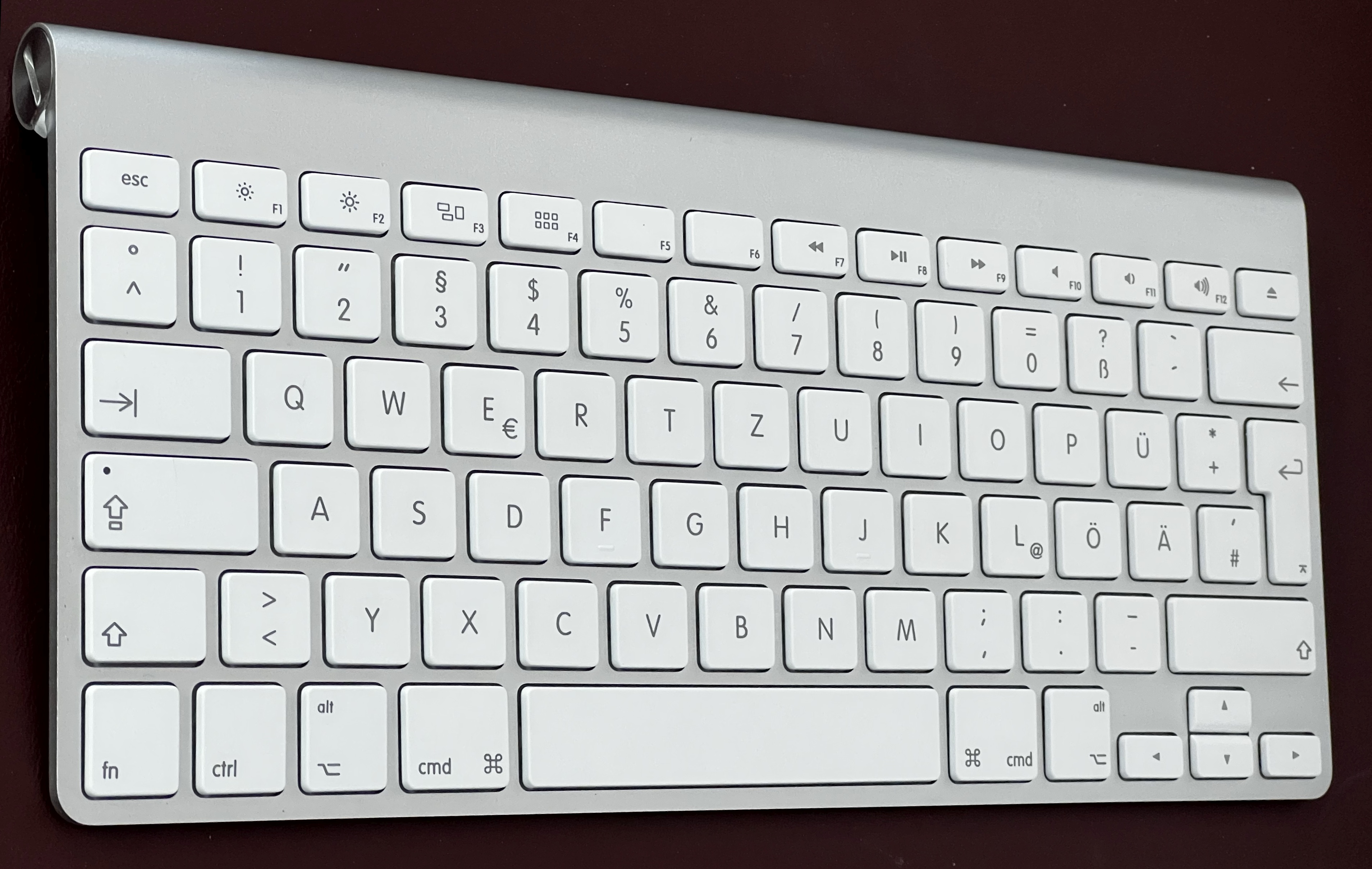
Apple wireless keyboard

There are several ways of connecting a keyboard to a system unit (more precisely, to its keyboard controller) using cables, including the standard AT connector commonly found on motherboards, which was eventually replaced by the PS/2 and the USB connection. Prior to the iMac line of systems, Apple used the proprietary Apple Desktop Bus for its keyboard connector.

Wireless keyboards have become popular. A wireless keyboard must have a transmitter built in, and a receiver connected to the computer's keyboard port; it communicates either by radio frequency (RF) or infrared (IR) signals. A wireless keyboard may use industry standard Bluetooth radio communication, in which case the receiver may be built into the computer. Wireless keyboards need batteries for power, and may be at risk of data eavesdropping. Wireless solar keyboards charge their batteries from small solar panels using natural or artificial light. The 1984 Apricot Portable is an early example of an IR keyboard.

== Alternative text-entering methods ==
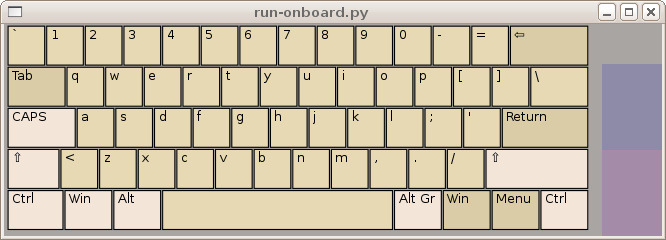
On-screen keyboard controlled with the mouse can be used by users with limited mobility.

Optical character recognition (OCR) is preferable to rekeying for converting existing text that is already written down but not in machine-readable format (for example, a Linotype-composed book from the 1940s). In other words, to convert the text from an image to editable text (that is, a string of character codes), a person could re-type it, or a computer could look at the image and deduce what each character is. OCR technology has already reached an impressive state (for example, Google Book Search) and promises more for the future.

Speech recognition converts speech into machine-readable text (that is, a string of character codes). This technology has also reached an advanced state and is implemented in various software products. For certain uses (e.g., transcription of medical or legal dictation; journalism; writing essays or novels) speech recognition is starting to replace the keyboard. However, the lack of privacy when issuing voice commands and dictation makes this kind of input unsuitable for many environments.

Pointing devices can be used to enter text or characters in contexts where using a physical keyboard would be inappropriate or impossible. These accessories typically present characters on a display, in a layout that provides fast access to the more frequently used characters or character combinations. Popular examples of this kind of input are Graffiti, Dasher and on-screen virtual keyboards.

== Other issues ==
=== Keystroke logging ===
Unencrypted wireless Bluetooth keyboards are known to be vulnerable to signal theft by placing a covert listening device in the same room as the keyboard to sniff and record Bluetooth packets for the purpose of logging keys typed by the user. Microsoft wireless keyboards 2011 and earlier are documented to have this vulnerability.

Keystroke logging (often called keylogging) is a method of capturing and recording user keystrokes. While it is used legally to measure employee productivity on certain clerical tasks, or by law enforcement agencies to find out about illegal activities, it is also used by hackers for various illegal or malicious acts. Hackers use keyloggers as a means to obtain passwords or encryption keys and thus bypass other security measures.

Keystroke logging can be achieved by both hardware and software means. Hardware key loggers are attached to the keyboard cable or installed inside standard keyboards. Software keyloggers work on the target computer's operating system and gain unauthorized access to the hardware, hook into the keyboard with functions provided by the OS, or use remote access software to transmit recorded data out of the target computer to a remote location. Some hackers also use wireless keylogger sniffers to collect packets of data being transferred from a wireless keyboard and its receiver, and then they crack the encryption key being used to secure wireless communications between the two devices.

Anti-spyware applications are able to detect many keyloggers and cleanse them. Responsible vendors of monitoring software support detection by anti-spyware programs, thus preventing abuse of the software. Enabling a firewall does not stop keyloggers per se, but can possibly prevent transmission of the logged material over the net if properly configured. Network monitors (also known as reverse-firewalls) can be used to alert the user whenever an application attempts to make a network connection. This gives the user the chance to prevent the keylogger from "phoning home" with his or her typed information. Automatic form-filling programs can prevent keylogging entirely by not using the keyboard at all. Historically, most keyloggers could be fooled by alternating between typing the login credentials and typing characters somewhere else in the focus window.

Keyboards are also known to emit electromagnetic signatures that can be detected using special spying equipment to reconstruct the keys pressed on the keyboard. Neal O'Farrell, executive director of the Identity Theft Council, revealed to InformationWeek that "More than 25 years ago, a couple of former spooks showed me how they could capture a user's ATM PIN, from a van parked across the street, simply by capturing and decoding the electromagnetic signals generated by every keystroke," O'Farrell said. "They could even capture keystrokes from computers in nearby offices, but the technology wasn't sophisticated enough to focus in on any specific computer."

=== Physical injury ===
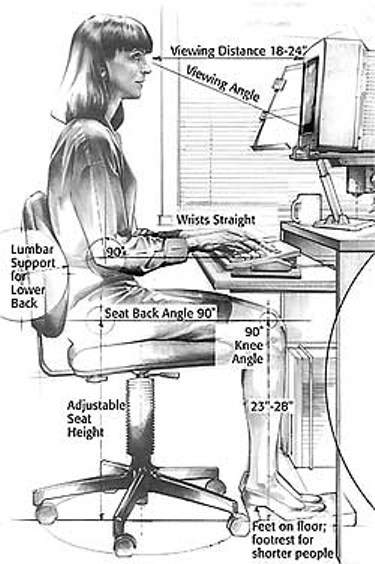
Proper ergonomic design of computer keyboard desks is necessary to prevent repetitive strain injuries, which can develop over time and can lead to long-term disability. Research suggests that the upright position formerly advocated can lead to degenerative disc disease, and that a 45 degree reclined position is healthier.

The use of any keyboard may cause serious injury (that is, carpal tunnel syndrome or other repetitive strain injury) to hands, wrists, arms, neck or back. The risks of injuries can be reduced by taking frequent short breaks to get up and walk around a couple of times every hour. As well, users should vary tasks throughout the day, to avoid overuse of the hands and wrists. When inputting at the keyboard, a person should keep the shoulders relaxed with the elbows at the side, with the keyboard and mouse positioned so that reaching is not necessary. The chair height and keyboard tray should be adjusted so that the wrists are straight, and the wrists should not be rested on sharp table edges. Wrist or palm rests should not be used while typing.

Some adaptive technology ranging from special keyboards, mouse replacements and pen tablet interfaces to speech recognition software can reduce the risk of injury. Pause software reminds the user to pause frequently. Switching to a much more ergonomic mouse, such as a vertical mouse or joystick mouse, may provide relief.

By using a touchpad or a stylus pen with a graphic tablet, in place of a mouse, one can lessen the repetitive strain on the arms and hands.

== See also ==
- Keyboard computer - popular form of computers in the early 1980s
- Digital pen
- Dvorak
- IBM PC keyboard
- Keyboard layout
- Keyboard protector
- Keyboard technology
- Keypad
- Maltron
- Numeric keypad
- Overlay keyboard
- Table of keyboard shortcuts
- Virtual keyboard (touchscreen keyboard)
