= Art. Lebedev Studio =

Russian design studio

- Company type: Private
- Industry: Internet
- Founded: 1995
- Headquarters: Moscow, Russia
- Key people: Artemy Lebedev
- Number of employees: 358 (2019)
- Website: www.artlebedev.com

Art. Lebedev Studio is a design firm in Russia, founded in 1995 by Artemy Lebedev.

The studio creates industrial and graphic design for commercial entities and does not accept projects from private citizens and political or religious organizations. Its motto is "Design will save the world." As of November 2011, it has five principal art directors and over 300 employees.

Art. Lebedev Studio is owned by the holding company Art. Lebedev Group (ALG), which owns several other design and advertising companies.

== History ==
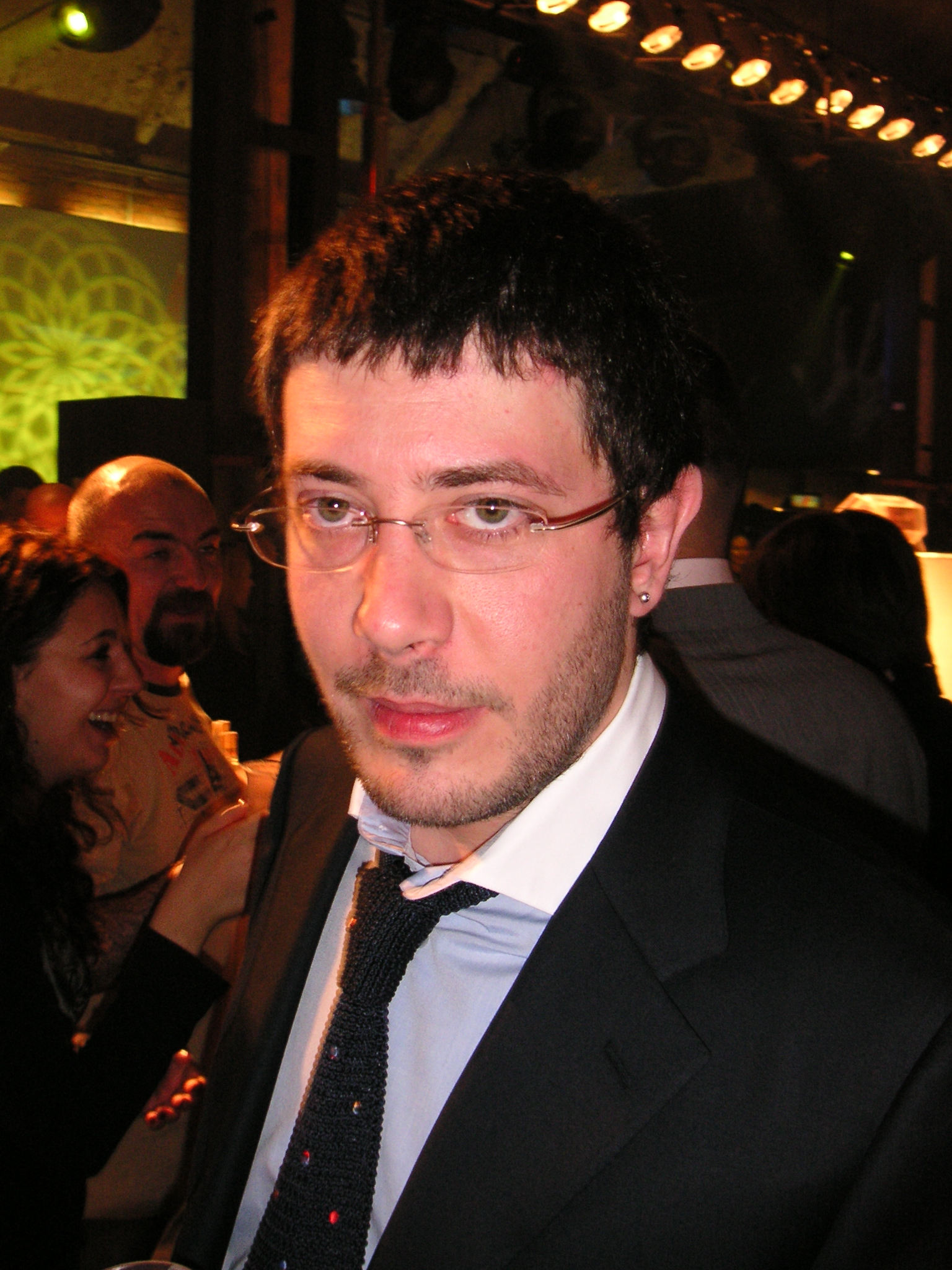
Artemy Lebedev, the Studio's founder, in 2005

The studio began with graphic design, then expanded to include interfaces, web design, and most recently industrial design. It has an educational center, a publishing house, a media department, and several software teams. In 2011, Russian advertising research company AdMe called them the leading web studio in Russia.

In 2010s, Art. Lebedev Studio sought to expand its international presence by establishing offices or affiliates outside Russia. Its portfolio came to include large-scale branding, wayfinding systems, and user interface projects.

== Website ==
The studio's official website is available in Russian and English.

== Projects ==
Art. Lebedev Studio produced the design for Russian search engine Yandex, financial group Alfa-Bank, the news sites Lenta.Ru and Gazeta.Ru and Russian promotional websites for Microsoft and Intel.

They designed the Optimus Maximus keyboard, with customizable Organic light-emitting diode displays on every key, and the Just5 Brick mobile phone. They also won a public vote for the best redesign of the Moscow Metro map, in 2013.

In 2020 the studio introduced “Nikolay Ironov,” an artificial-intelligence-based design tool that gained media attention for producing commercial logos without clients’ prior knowledge of its automated nature.

== See also ==
- Parser, a web scripting language developed by the studio for its web projects and released as free software.
