= Sonder Design =

Australian electronics company

Sonder Design is an Australian design studio with its headquarters in Sydney at the Australian Technology Park. They designed the Sonder keyboard, a dynamic E Ink keyboard.

The company has offices in Sydney, Shenzhen and Taipei. Sonder uses a transparent patented mechanism above a display which can dynamically change to adapt to the keyboard layout in use or to show the function of the key.

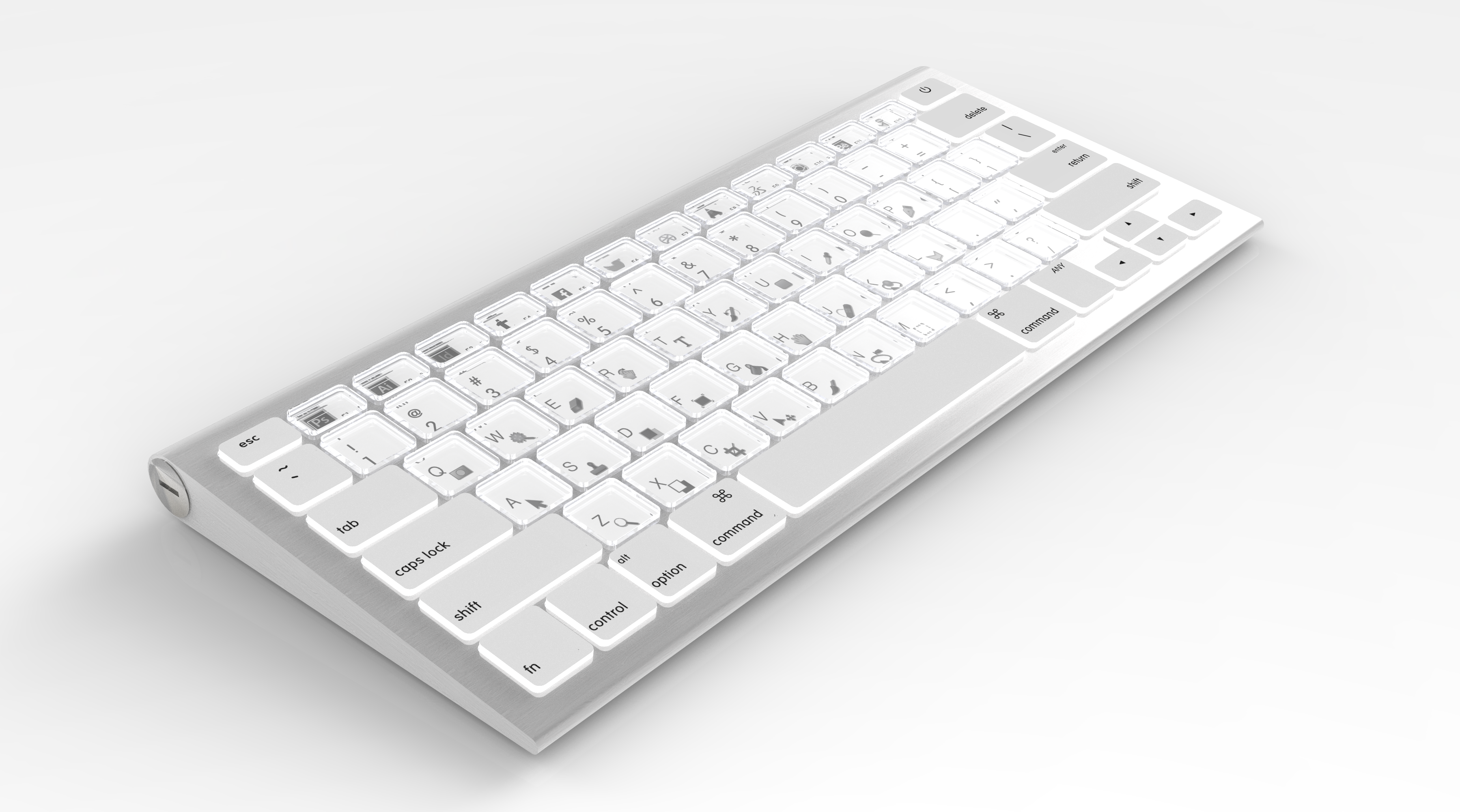
Sonder keyboard.

== Overview ==
The production model uses a single E ink display from E Ink Holdings. The design featured on the design studio's website received attention on the web when it was featured on Wired in July 2015, as well as other technology websites.

The Sonder keyboard allows for greater user interaction, by dynamically displaying the current function of the keys. For example, when the user presses the Shift key, the pictures would change to upper-case versions. It would also make switching between different keyboard layouts (such as English and Cyrillic) rapid, and could make the switch to alternative layouts such as Dvorak easier for people who only have a QWERTY keyboard with no possibility of rearranging the keys.

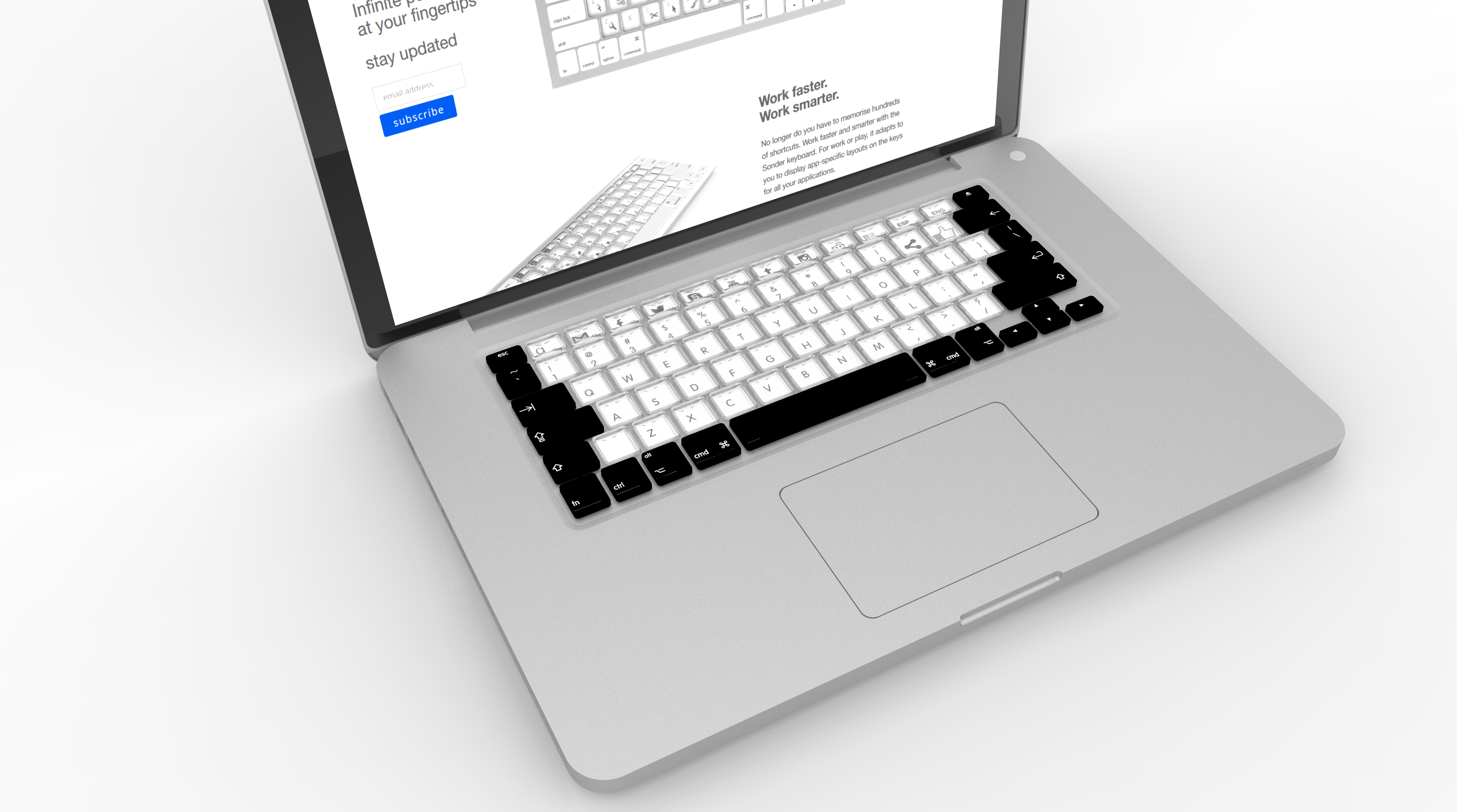
Artist's impression of a Sonder keyboard module integrated into a Macbook.

== Apple acquisition rumors ==
According to a report by The Guardian and The Wall Street Journal, Apple had approached the startup for acquisition with the assistance of Foxconn. Sonder issued a press release stating that co-founder Francisco Serra-Martins did not meet with Apple CEO Tim Cook in Shenzhen, China on October 26, 2016, as reported. Members of Sonder's sales and MacBook architecture team are Apple alumni.

== Production schedule ==
Initial reports indicated that the keyboards will start shipping during 2017. The keyboard is being manufactured by Foxconn.

== Acquisition by Foxconn ==
Reports indicate that Sonder was acquired by strategic partner Foxconn International Holdings in late 2019.

== Similar keyboards ==
The patent for this "Display Keyboard" (U.S. Patent 5,818,361)[12] has expired. However, the first programmable LCD keyboard [13] was developed in the mid-1980s in Germany. This keyboard, sold under the LCBoard name in the U.S. until 1999, contained many of the features of the Optimus keyboard including monochrome graphic icons on each keyboard key, macro programming, context-sensitive and application-dependent switching between functions. S. Bigbie et al. published related ideas in an IBM Technical Disclosure Bulletin (Vol. 21 No. 2 July 1978), as did Alan Bagley of Hewlett-Packard in (U.S. Patent 4,078,257).

A concept design using E Ink technology was created by Maxim Mezentsev and Aleksander Suhih in 2013.

A patent application filed on 13 March 2007 suggests that Apple Inc. may be working on a similar dynamically changeable organic light-emitting diode (OLED) keyboard.
