= Artemy Lebedev =

Russian designer and businessman (born 1975)

- Артемий Лебедев
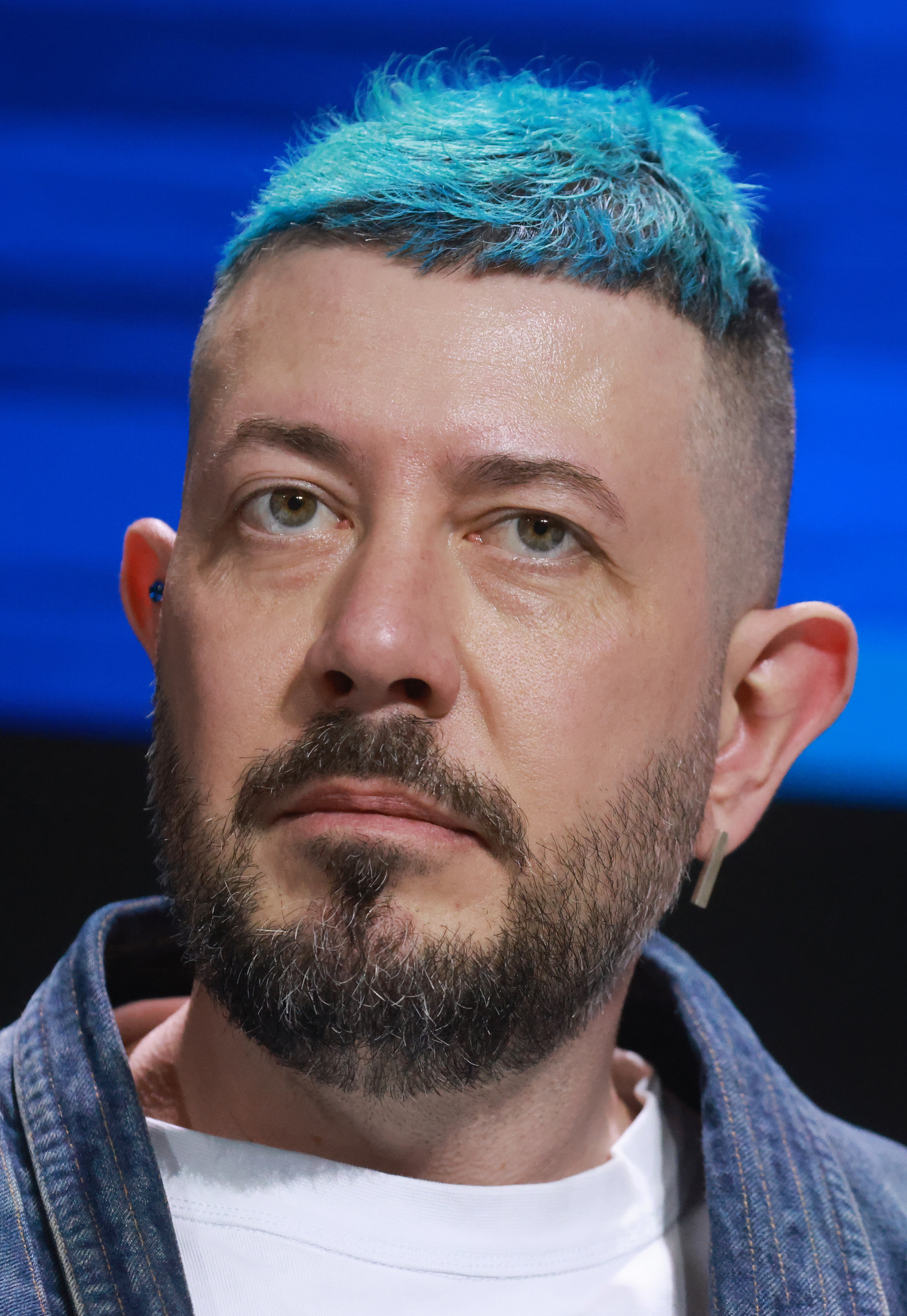
- Lebedev in June 2023
- Born: 13 February 1975 (age 51); Moscow, Russian SFSR, Soviet Union
- Occupation: Founder of Art. Lebedev Studio
- Years active: 1995–present
- Children: 10
- Mother: Tatyana Tolstaya
- Website: https://www.tema.ru

Artemy Andreyevich Lebedev (Russian: Артемий Андреевич Лебедев; born 13 February 1975) is a Russian designer, entrepreneur and Internet personality. He is the founder of the design company Art. Lebedev Studio. He is also an avid blogger, known for provocative views and frequent use of obscene language. Lebedev is a member of the Tolstoy family.

== Biography ==
Born in Moscow February 13, 1975, Lebedev is the son of the Russian writer Tatyana Tolstaya and a member of the aristocratic Tolstoy family. He graduated from Moscow State School 57. He enrolled at Faculty of Journalism at the Moscow State University, but dropped out during his second year. He spent the following years working for a few design studios until 1995 when he founded his own company.

According to The Best Travelled Master List, Lebedev is one of the very few people in the world and the only Russian who has travelled to each of the 193 countries of the World.

=== Artemy Lebedev Studio ===
In 1995, Lebedev founded design studio WebDesign, which in 1998 was renamed the Artemy Lebedev Studio. The company has completed works in corporate identity, books, magazines, road signs, pictograms, graphical and physical interfaces, websites, industrial design, industrial graphics objects, and storefronts.

==== "Business lynch", "spanking" ====
One of the headings of the site was that anyone could send Lebedev a graphic object or a website, and he, in turn, made up his critical opinion of this work. The column was called "Spanking" and was published quarterly. Later, the heading was renamed "Polit spanking". By 2006, the category was closed and removed from the site. On September 1 of the same year, the column was restored and called "Business Lynch", but now it was not only Lebedev who reviewed it. In September 2019, the project was terminated.

=== VK ===
In October 2023, Lebedev was appointed design director of VK, a Russian state-controlled social media platform.

== Controversies and sanctions ==
In 2020, Lebedev appeared in a promotional video in support of 2020 Russian constitutional referendum. Russian President Vladimir Putin later awarded Lebedev with an Order "For Merit to the Fatherland" in the 2nd degree for his contributions to the Russian segment of the Internet.

Artemy Lebedev Studio designed the official logo for the region of Crimea shortly after its 2014 Russian annexation, a step which drew criticism as being aligned with the occupied status of the territory.

Lebedev was banned from entering Ukraine in March 2017. According to the Holodomor National Museum, Lebedev actively supports the Russian invasion, has travelled to occupied Crimea and Donbas, and has made public statements denying the existence of a Ukrainian nation-state (“there are no Ukrainians, Ukraine is a region of Russia”).

In March 2023, the Security Service of Ukraine (SBU) charged Lebedev with collaborationism and justifying Russia's aggressive war against Ukraine. The charges relate to his 2022 visits to occupied Ukrainian territory (including the Ukrainian city of Mariupol and the Zaporizhzhia Nuclear Power Plant) in June 2022 and propaganda activities. Lebedev called the visit one of "my life's small joys." In July 2023, two Kyiv apartments owned by Lebedev were seized by the Ukrainian Ministry of Justice.

Lebedev was barred from entering Latvia in 2024 and Armenia in 2025.
