= Typing =

Text input method

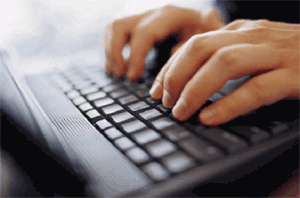
Person typing on a laptop keyboard

Video of typing on a notebook computer keyboard

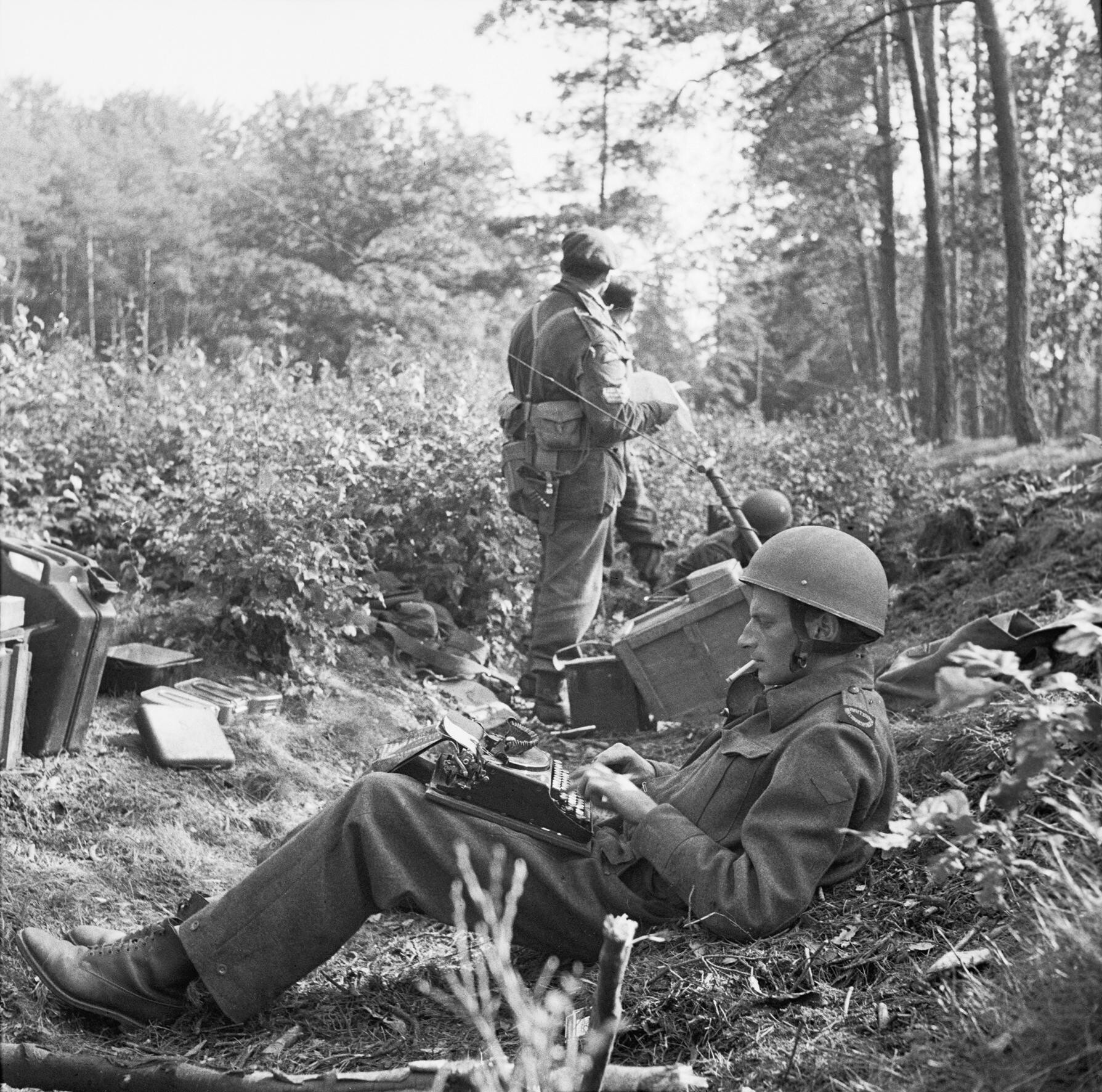
War correspondent typing his dispatch in the woods outside Arnhem, 1944

Typing is the process of entering or inputting text by pressing keys on a typewriter, computer keyboard, mobile phone, or calculator. It can be distinguished from other means of text input, such as handwriting and speech recognition; text can be in the form of letters, numbers and other symbols. The world's first typist was Lillian Sholes from Wisconsin in the United States, the daughter of Christopher Latham Sholes, who invented the first practical typewriter.

User interface features such as spell checker and autocomplete serve to facilitate and speed up typing and to prevent or correct errors the typist may make.

== Techniques ==
=== Hunt and peck ===
Hunt and peck (two-fingered typing) is a common form of typing in which the typist presses each key individually. In the purest form of the method, the typist finds each key by sight on the fly, and uses only one or two fingers (typically the index fingers). Although good accuracy may be achieved, the use of this method may also prevent the typist from being able to see what has been typed without glancing away from the keys, and any typing errors that are made may not be noticed immediately. Since only a few fingers are used in this technique, the fingers move much greater distances than in touch typing.

Video of "hybrid" style typing using two fingers

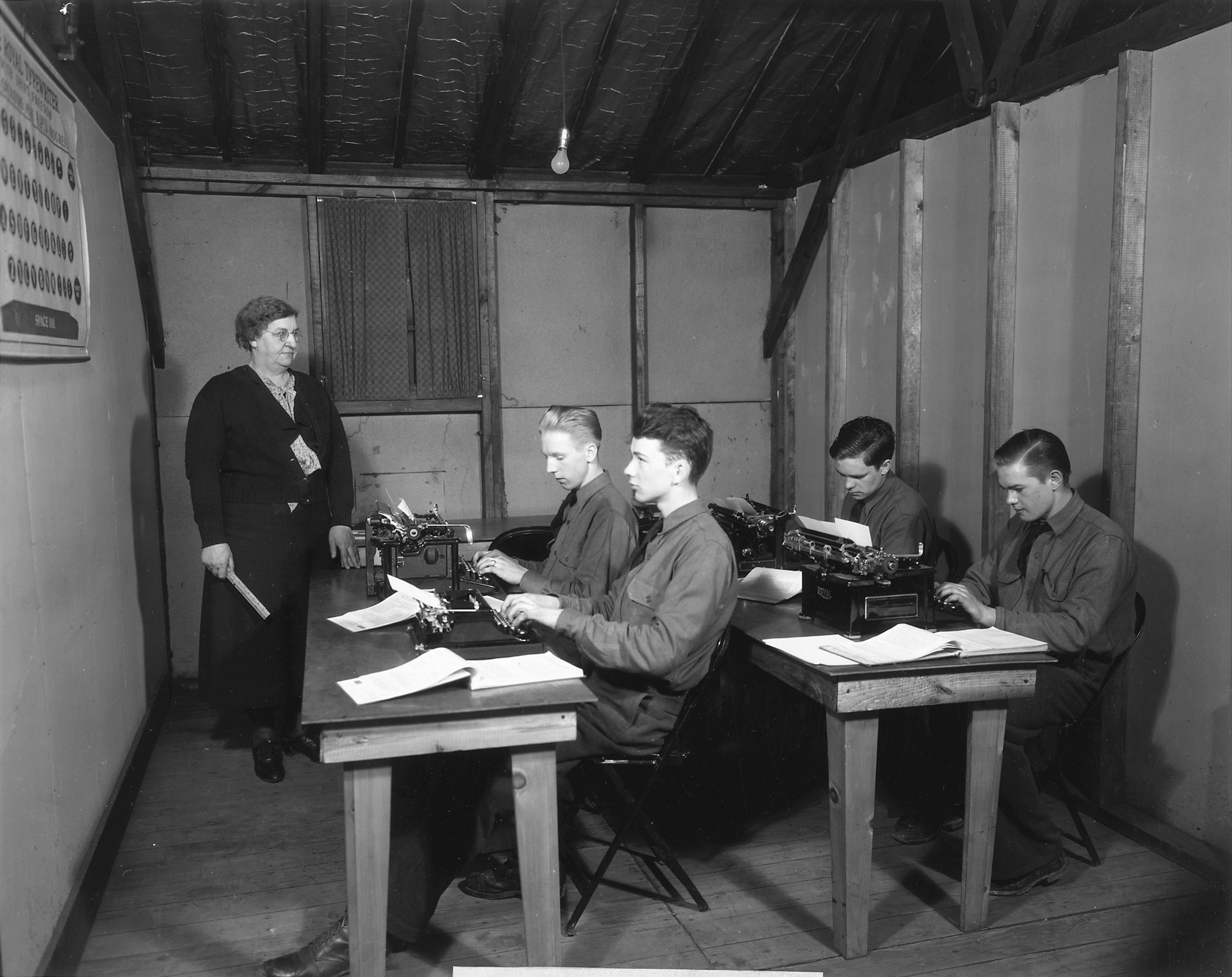
Civilian Conservation Corps typing class, 1933

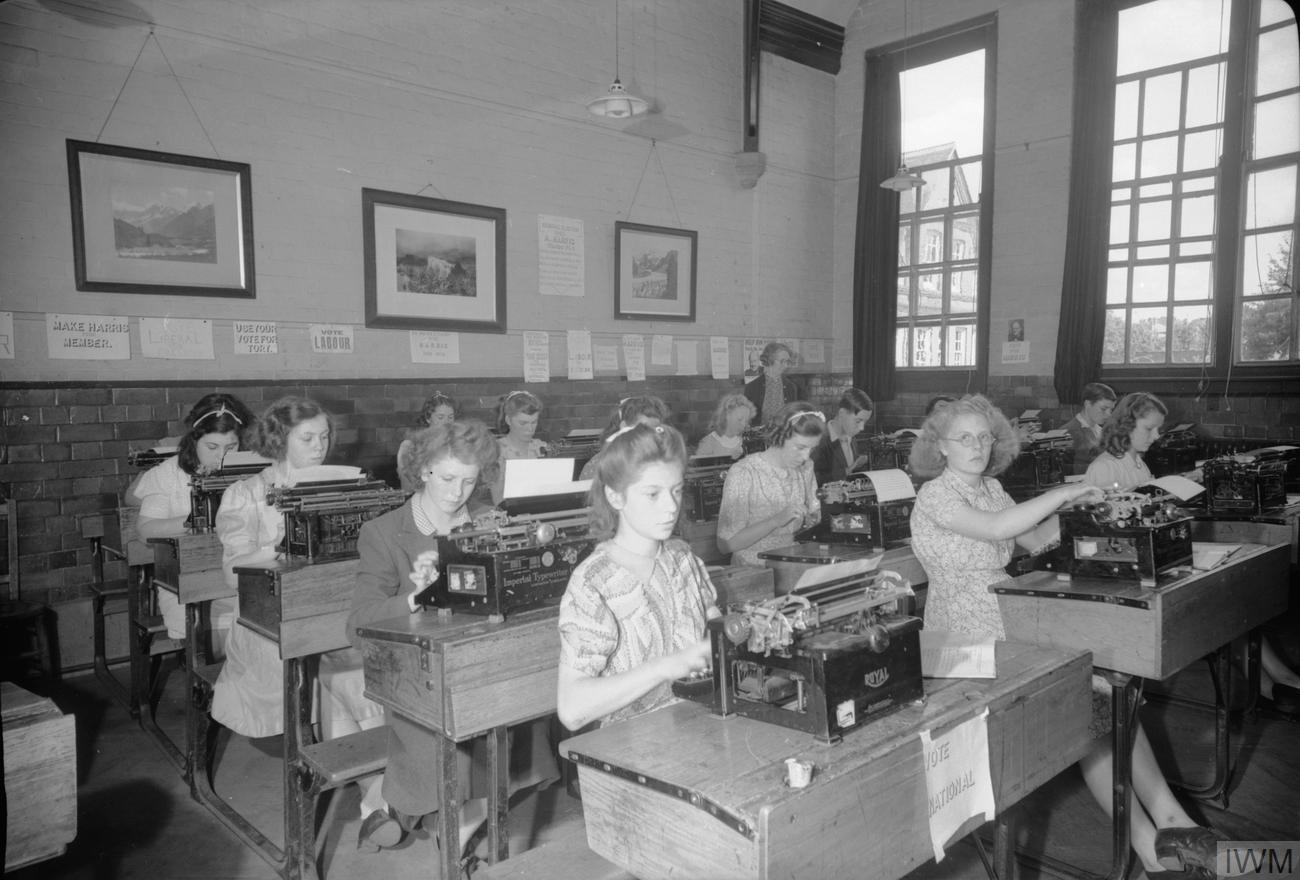
Pupils in typing class at a secondary school in Reading, England (1945)

=== Touch typing ===
Typing zones on a QWERTY keyboard for each finger taken from KTouch (home row keys are circled)

In this technique, the typist keeps their eyes on the source copy at all times. Touch typing also involves the use of the home row method, where typists rest their wrist down, rather than lifting up and typing (which can cause carpal tunnel syndrome). To avoid this, typists should sit up tall, leaning slightly forward from the waist, place their feet flat on the floor in front of them with one foot slightly in front of the other, and keep their elbows close to their sides with forearms slanted slightly upward to the keyboard; fingers should be curved slightly and rest on the home row.

Many touch typists also use keyboard shortcuts when typing on a computer. This allows them to edit their document without having to take their hands off the keyboard to use a mouse. An example of a keyboard shortcut is pressing the Ctrl key plus the S key to save a document as they type, or the Ctrl key plus the Z key to undo a mistake. Other shortcuts are the Ctrl key plus the C to copy and the Ctrl key and the V key to paste, and the Ctrl key and the X key to cut, or Ctrl plus ← Backspace to delete an entire word. Many experienced typists can feel or sense when they have made an error and can hit the ← Backspace key and make the correction with no increase in time between keystrokes.

=== Hybrid ===
There are many idiosyncratic, or unique, typing styles in between novice-style "hunt and peck" and touch typing. For example, many "hunt and peck" typists have the keyboard layout memorized and are able to type while focusing their gaze on the screen. Some use just two fingers, while others use 3–6 fingers. Some use their fingers very consistently, with the same finger being used to type the same character every time, while others vary the way they use their fingers.

One study examining 30 subjects, of varying different styles and expertise, has found minimal difference in typing speed between touch typists and self-taught hybrid typists. According to the study, "The number of fingers does not determine typing speed... People using self-taught typing strategies were found to be as fast as trained typists... instead of the number of fingers, there are other factors that predict typing speed... fast typists... keep their hands fixed on one position, instead of moving them over the keyboard, and more consistently use the same finger to type a certain letter." To quote Prof. Dr. Anna Feit: "We were surprised to observe that people who took a typing course, performed at similar average speed and accuracy, as those that taught typing to themselves and only used 6 fingers on average."

=== Thumbing ===
A late 20th century trend in typing, primarily used with devices with small keyboards (such as PDAs and Smartphones), is thumbing or thumb typing. This can be accomplished using either only one thumb or both the thumbs, with more proficient typists reaching speeds of 100 words per minute. Similar to desktop keyboards and input devices, if a user overuses keys which need hard presses and/or have small and unergonomic layouts, it could cause thumb tendonitis or other repetitive strain injury. The practice of "thumbing" was popularized by the BlackBerry pager.

== Words per minute ==
Words per minute (WPM) is a measure of typing speed, commonly used in recruitment. For the purposes of WPM measurement, a word is standardized to five characters or keystrokes. Therefore, "brown" counts as one word but "mozzarella" counts as two.

The benefits of a standardized measurement of input speed are that it enables comparison across language and hardware boundaries. The speed of an Afrikaans-speaking operator in Cape Town can be compared with a French-speaking operator in Paris.

Today, even Written Chinese can be typed very quickly using the combination of a software prediction system and by typing their sounds in Pinyin. Such prediction software even allows typing short-hand forms while producing complete characters. For example, the phrase "nǐ chī le ma" (你吃了吗) meaning "Have you eaten yet?" can be typed with just 4 strokes: "nclm".

=== Alphanumeric entry ===
In one study of average computer users, the average rate for transcription was 33 words per minute, and 19 words per minute for composition. In the same study, when the group was divided into "fast", "moderate" and "slow" groups, the average speeds were 40 wpm, 35 wpm, and 23 wpm respectively. An average professional typist reaches 50 to 80 wpm, while some positions can require 80 to 95 wpm (usually the minimum required for dispatch positions and other typing jobs), and some advanced typists work at speeds above 120 wpm. Two-finger typists, sometimes also referred to as "hunt and peck" typists, commonly reach sustained speeds of about 37 wpm for memorized text and 27 wpm when copying text, but in bursts may be able to reach speeds of 60 to 70 wpm. From the 1920s through the 1970s, typing speed (along with shorthand speed) was an important secretarial qualification and typing contests were popular and often publicized by typewriter companies as promotional tools.

A less common measure of the speed of a typist, CPM is used to identify the number of characters typed per minute. This is a common measurement for typing programs, or typing tutors, as it can give a more accurate measure of a person's typing speed without having to type for a prolonged period of time. The common conversion factor between WPM and CPM is 5. It is also used occasionally for associating the speed of a reader with the amount they have read. CPM has also been applied to 20th century printers, but modern faster printers more commonly use PPM (pages per minute).

216 words per minute was achieved by Stella Pajunas-Garnand from Chicago in 1946 in one minute on an IBM electric using the QWERTY keyboard layout.

The Associated Press reported Barbara Blackburn achieving a speed of 194 wpm in October 1984 using the MasterType typing game. In a January 1985 story in the Los Angeles Times, Blackburn said she had recently reached 196 wpm. During her Late Night appearance on January 24, 1985, she claimed to have achieved 170 wpm on minute tests, and 200 wpm using a computer. In May 1985, The Seattle Times reported that Blackburn said she had "attained speeds of 212 words a minute for a brief time" using an Apple computer keyboard and the Dvorak layout.

The recent emergence of several competitive typing websites has allowed fast typists on computer keyboards to emerge along with new records, though many of these are unverifiable. Some notable, records include 255 wpm on a one-minute, random-word test by a user under the username slekap and occasionally bailey, 213 wpm on a 1-hour, random-word test by Joshua Hu, 221 wpm average on 10 random quotes by Joshua Hu, and first place in the 2020 Ultimate Typing Championship by Anthony Ermollin based on an average of 180.88 wpm on texts of various lengths. All of their records were set on the QWERTY keyboard layout.

The current fastest typist goes by the username MythicalRocket, with a speed of 319 WPM for 15 seconds using the QWERTY keyboard layout.

Using a personalized interface, physicist Stephen Hawking, who suffered from amyotrophic lateral sclerosis, managed to type 15 wpm with a switch and adapted software created by Walt Woltosz. Due to a slowdown of his motor skills, his interface was upgraded with an infrared camera that detected "twitches in the cheek muscle under the eye." His typing speed decreased to approximately one word per minute in the later part of his life.

=== Numeric entry ===
The numeric entry, or 10-key, speed is a measure of one's ability to manipulate a numeric keypad. Generally, it is measured in keystrokes per hour (KPH).

== Text-entry research ==
=== Error analysis ===
With the introduction of computers and word-processors, there has been a change in how text-entry is performed. In the past, using a typewriter, speed was measured with a stopwatch and errors were tallied by hand. With the current technology, document preparation is more about using word-processors as a composition aid, changing the meaning of error rate and how it is measured. Research, performed by R. William Soukoreff and I. Scott MacKenzie, has led to a discovery of the application of a well-known algorithm. Through the use of this algorithm and accompanying analysis technique, two statistics were used, minimum string distance error rate (MSD error rate) and keystrokes per character (KSPC). The two advantages of this technique include:

- Participants are allowed to enter text naturally, since they may commit errors and correct them.
- The identification of errors and generation of error rate statistics is easy to automate.

==== Deconstructing the text input process ====
Through analysis of keystrokes, the keystrokes of the input stream were divided into four classes: Correct (C), Incorrect Fixed (IF), Fixes (F), and Incorrect Not Fixed (INF). These key stroke classification is broken down into the following

- The two classes Correct and Incorrect Not Fixed comprise all of the characters in transcribed text.
- Fixes (F) keystrokes are easy to identify, and include keystrokes such as backspace, delete, cursor movements, and modifier keys.
- Incorrect Fixed (IF) keystrokes are found in the input stream, but not the transcribed text, and are not editing keys.

Using these classes, the Minimum String Distance Error Rate and the Key Strokes per Character statistics can both be calculated.

==== Minimum string distance error rate ====
The minimum string distance (MSD) is the number of "primitives" which is the number of insertions, deletions, or substitutions to transform one string into another. The following equation was found for the MSD Error Rate.

MSD Error Rate = $(INF/(C + INF)) * 100\%$

==== Key strokes per character (KSPC) ====
With the minimum string distance error, errors that are corrected do not appear in the transcribed text. The following example shows why this can be an important class of errors to consider:

Presented Text: the quick brown
Input Stream: the quix<-ck brown
Transcribed Text: the quick brown

In the above example, the incorrect character ('x') was deleted with a backspace ('<-'). Since these errors do not appear in the transcribed text, the MSD error rate is 0%. That is the purpose of the key strokes per character (KSPC) statistic.

KSPC = $(C+INF+IF+F)/(C+INF)$

There are some shortcomings of the KSPC statistic, such as:

- High KSPC values can be related to either many errors which were corrected, or few errors which were not corrected; however, there is no way to distinguish the two.
- KSPC depends on the text input method, and cannot be used to meaningfully compare two different input methods, such as a QWERTY keyboard and a multi-tap device.
- There is no obvious way to combine KSPC and MSD into an overall error rate, even though they have an inverse relationship.

==== Further metrics ====
Using the classes described above, further metrics were defined by R. William Soukoreff and I.Scott MacKenzie:

Error correction efficiency refers to the ease with which the participant performed error correction.

- Correction Efficiency = IF/F

Participant conscientiousness is the ratio of corrected errors to the total number of error, which helps distinguish perfectionists from apathetic participants.

- Participant Conscientiousness = IF / (IF + INF)

If C represents the amount of useful information transferred, INF, IF, and F represent the proportion of bandwidth wasted.

- Utilized Bandwidth = C / (C + INF + IF + F)
- Wasted Bandwidth = (INF + IF + F)/ (C + INF + IF + F)

==== Total error rate ====
The classes described also provide an intuitive definition of total error rate:

- Total Error Rate = ((INF + IF)/ (C + INF + IF)) * 100%
- Not Corrected Error Rate = (INF/ (C + INF + IF)) * 100%
- Corrected Error Rate = (IF/ (C + INF + IF)) * 100%

Since these three error rates are ratios, they are comparable between different devices, something that cannot be done with the KSPC statistic, which is device dependent.

=== Tools for text entry research ===
Currently, two tools are publicly available for text entry researchers to record text entry performance metrics. The first is TEMA that runs only on the Android (operating system). The second is WebTEM that runs on any device with a modern Web browser, and works with almost all text entry technique.

== Keystroke dynamics ==
Keystroke dynamics, or typing dynamics, is the obtaining of detailed timing information that describes exactly when each key was pressed and when it was released as a person is typing at a computer keyboard for biometric identification, similar to speaker recognition. Data needed to analyze keystroke dynamics is obtained by keystroke logging.

The behavioral biometric of Keystroke Dynamics uses the manner and rhythm in which an individual types characters on a keyboard or keypad.

== See also ==
- Muscle memory – Consolidating a motor task into memory through repetition
- Stenotype – Specialized typewriter or chorded keyboard for recording in shorthand
- Copy typist – Person who transcribes manuscript to type
- Audio typist – Person who transcribes voice to text
- Data entry clerk – Profession
- Ratatype — online platform for learning touch typing.
- Speed typing contest – Typing speed competition
- Typesetting – Composition of text by means of arranging physical types or digital equivalents
- Typing Day – Annual event in Malaysia
