= Secretarial pool =

Standby group of secretaries for an executive

A secretarial pool or typing pool is a group of secretaries working at a company available to assist any executive without a permanently assigned secretary. These groups have been reduced or eliminated where executives have been assigned responsibility for writing their own letters and other secretarial work.

After the widespread adoption of the typewriter but before the photocopier and personal computer, pools of typists were needed by large companies to produce documents from handwritten manuscripts, re-type documents that had been edited, type documents from audio recordings, or to type copies of documents.

== See also ==
- Hot desking
- Temporary work
- Copy typist
- Audio typist
