= Muscle memory (disambiguation) =

Muscle memory is the consolidation of a motor task through repetition.

Muscle memory may also refer to:

- Muscle memory (strength training), recovery from inactivity in athletes
- Muscle Memory, a 2013 studio album by Jamie Lenman
- "Muscle Memory", a song by Justice from the 2024 album Hyperdrama
- "Muscle Memory", a song by Kelsea Ballerini from the 2022 album Subject to Change
