= UTC (disambiguation) =

UTC, or Coordinated Universal Time, is the primary time standard globally used to regulate clocks and time.

UTC may also refer to:

== Organizations and institutions ==
- Unicode Technical Committee, a part of the Unicode Consortium
- Unión de Trabajadores Colombianos, Colombian trade union confederation
- Union of Communist Youth in Romania
- Union Treiziste Catalane, the former name of the Saint-Estève XIII Catalan (a French rugby league club based in Perpignan, and feeder club of Catalans Dragons since 2006)
- Unit Tindakan Cepat, special response units of the Royal Malaysian Police
- United Technologies Corporation, a former conglomerate (nowadays Raytheon Technologies, Otis Worldwide and Carrier Global)
- United Theological College (disambiguation)
- United Transitional Cabinet, a government-in-exile for Belarus created in 2022
- Universidad Técnica de Cajamarca, a Peruvian football club from Cajamarca
- Université de Technologie de Compiègne, a French university and grande école
- University Technical College, a type of publicly financed but independently run school in England for 14- to 19-year-old students
- University of Tennessee at Chattanooga
- Utah Technical College, the former name of Salt Lake Community College
- Uttarakhand Transport Corporation, a state owned transport company in Uttarakhand, India
- Washington Utilities and Transportation Commission

== Places ==
- UTC, IATA code for Soesterberg Air Base in the Netherlands
- University Transportation Center
- Urban Transformation Centre, a public amenities centre in Malaysia
- Mall at University Town Center, Mall at UTC, a shopping mall located in Sarasota County, Florida, United States
- Westfield UTC, University Town Center, a shopping mall and transit hub in San Diego, California, United States
  - University City, San Diego, California, a neighborhood often referred to as 'UTC' because of the UTC mall

== Other uses ==
- Ultimate Typing Championship
- Unified theory of cognition
- Uniform Trust Code
- Urgent treatment centre, a term for Urgent care centre used in the UK

== See also ==
- UCT (disambiguation)
