= Albert Tangora =

American speed typist (1903–1978)

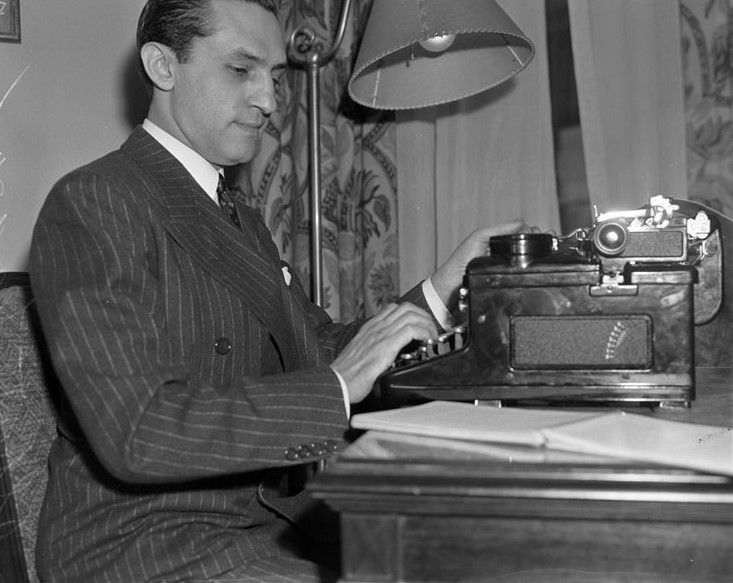
- Tangora in 1938
- Born: July 2, 1903; Paterson, New Jersey, U.S.
- Died: April 7, 1978 (aged 74); Evanston, Illinois, U.S.
- Known for: being the fastest typer on a typewriter
- Spouses: Dorothy Lane (m. 1926) Virginia Martin (m. 1934)
- Children: 2

Albert Tangora (July 2, 1903 – April 7, 1978) was an American competitive typist who was widely regarded as having the fastest typing speed on a typewriter. Born in Paterson, New Jersey, Tangora began typing in 1916, entering typing contests the following year.

On October 22, 1923, Tangora set the 60-minute typing speed world record at 147 words per minute (WPM). After a rest period, he typed 159 words in a one-minute "sprint". The typewriter he used was a QWERTY keyboard Underwood Standard. Although it was eventually beaten by an electric model in 1941, Tangora continues to hold the record on a manual typewriter.

Throughout his typing career, he appeared in advertisements for typewriter companies Underwood Typewriter Company and Royal Typewriter Company.

After retiring, Tangora began competing again in subsequent typing competitions sponsored by the International Commercial Schools Association. He held the record there as well at 141 WPM, set in 1937 on a Royal typewriter. He later beat his own record with a typing speed of 142 WPM. In all, he won the competition seven times.

== Life and career ==
Tangora was born on July 2, 1903, in Paterson, New Jersey. He was one of eight children raised by contractor Charles Tangora and his wife, Angelina, an Italian-born couple who immigrated to the United States in 1903. On June 20, 1916, Tangora graduated from Paterson's Public School Number 5.

=== Competitive typing ===
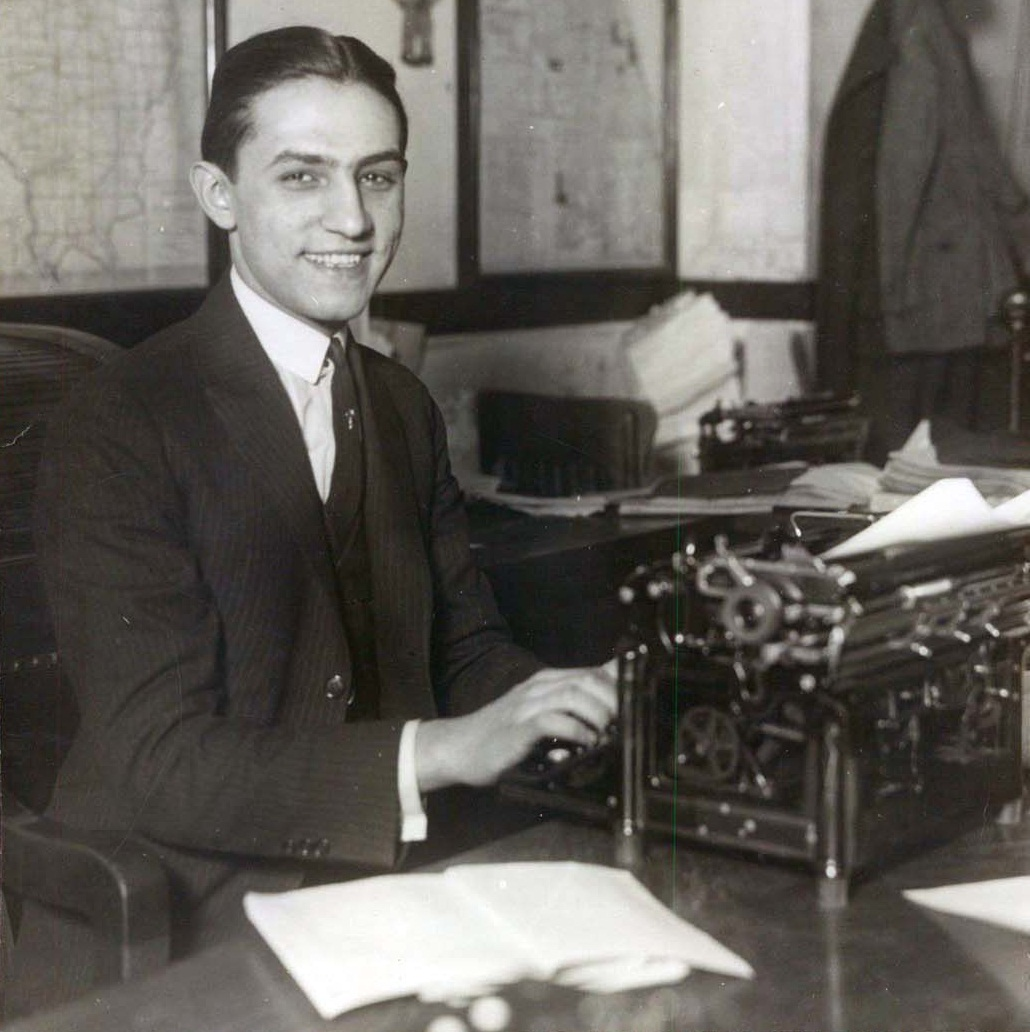
Tangora in c. 1922

Tangora began learning the practice of typing in late 1916, just months after his graduation from public school. On January 31, 1917, as a novice student, he received his diploma from Spencer's Business College during the graduation ceremony. Additionally, he and three other graduates were entered to compete in the World's Championship set for October 1917.

Tangora began competing in typewriter speed typing contests in the "Novice" (15-minute) division, when during the New England Business Show held at Mechanics Hall in Boston, Massachusetts, Tangora won the Eastern States typewriting contest held on April 9, 1917, for having a 15-minute typing speed of 91 words per minute (WPM). On October 15, 1917, he went on to win the Novice division for the World's Championship Typewriting Contest in New York City with a 15-minute typing speed of 110 WPM. He began competing in the "Amateur" (30-minute) division, where on October 14, 1918, he competed in the World Championship Contest with a 30-minute typing speed of 117 WPM, winning the following year on October 20, 1919, with a 30-minute typing speed of 133 WPM.

In the early 1920s, Tangora began touring throughout the United States to present typing demonstrations at educational institutions and businesses in partnership with the Underwood Typewriter Company, including at Goldey–Beacom College, West Chester High School in Pennsylvania, as well as the Massey Business College. He additionally began competing in the "Professional" (60-minute) division by entering the World Typewriting Championship held at Grand Central Palace on October 25, 1920, placing fourth with a 60-minute typing speed of 124 WPM. Tangora worked for the Underwood Typewriter Company in its education department, spending the first half of 1921 touring throughout the south and west United States. After returning to New Jersey in June 1921, he began training for the Professional division. Tangora competed in the next World Typewriting Championship held in New York City on October 17, 1921, where he placed third with a typing speed of 132 WPM. The following year, he again placed third at the next World's Championship Typewriting Contest on October 23, 1922, with a typing speed of 141 WPM.

On October 22, 1923, Tangora set the 60-minute typing speed world record at 147 WPM. After a rest period, he typed 159 words in a one-minute "sprint". The typewriter he used was an Underwood Standard, which had QWERTY keyboards.

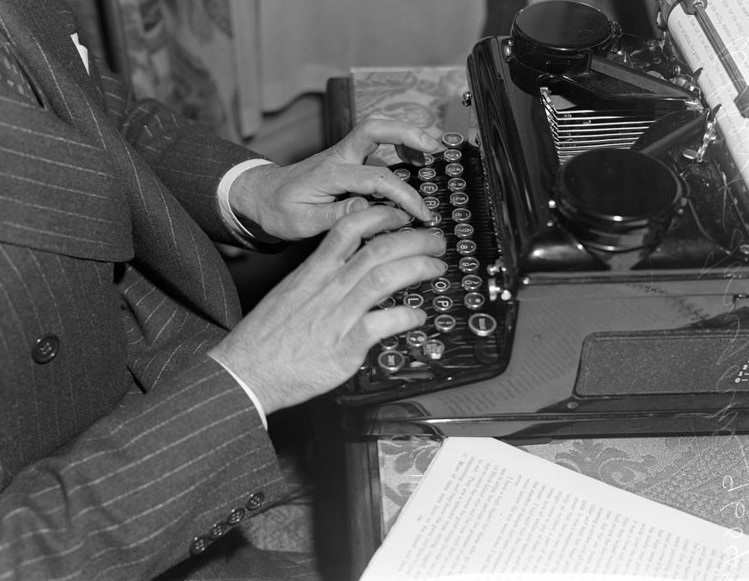
Tangora demonstrating his typing in 1938

After temporarily retiring, he began competing again in subsequent typing competitions sponsored by the International Commercial Schools Association. In 1936, Tangora insured his hands for $100,000. In preparation for competing in speed typing competitions, he would dip his fingers in mixed talcum powder and alum. The following year, he used a Royal typewriter to set the International Commercial Schools Association typing record with a typing speed of 141 WPM. He later beat his own record with a typing speed of 142 WPM. Tangora wrote a booklet about typing, called "Fifty Common Typing Faults and How To Avoid Them."

=== World War II service ===
On February 16, 1942, Tangora was registered to draft for World War II. At the time, he was working for the Royal Typewriter Company in New York City. By March 1944, he was serving in the United States Naval Reserve as a lieutenant commander. He later became a Chief Yeoman at Oahu, giving typing lessons to classes in the Navy. He is the subject of the film Albert Tangora in Action, in which he demonstrates typing techniques including proper posture, arm positioning, and warmups.

== Personal life and death ==
In January 1926, Tangora married typing pupil Dorothy Lane. In early 1934, Tangora was living in Paterson, New Jersey; he married Virginia Martin of Evanston, Illinois, a music teacher at Watseka Community High School in Watseka, Illinois. He later moved to Evanston, where he owned the Albert Tangora Typewriter and Office Equipment Co. and eventually retired.

On April 7, 1978, Tangora died in the Evanston Hospital at the age of 74 after a heart attack. At the time of his death, his hour-long typing record of 147 words per minute was not known to have been broken.

== See also ==
News reel footage of Tangora's typing speed: https://www.gettyimages.ca/detail/video/speed-typist-albert-tangora-typing-on-a-typewriter-on-news-footage/2152957565
