= Populaire (film) =

2012 film by Régis Roinsard

- Theatrical release poster
- Directed by: Régis Roinsard
- Written by: Régis Roinsard; Daniel Presley; Romain Compingt
- Produced by: Alain Attal
- Starring: Romain Duris; Déborah François; Bérénice Bejo; Shaun Benson; Mélanie Bernier; Nicolas Bedos; Miou-Miou; Eddy Mitchell; Frédéric Pierrot
- Cinematography: Guillaume Schiffman
- Edited by: Laure Gardette; Sophie Reine
- Music by: Rob; Emmanuel d'Orlando
- Production companies: Les Productions du Trésor; France 3 Cinéma; France 2 Cinéma; Mars Films; Wild Bunch; Panache Productions; La Compagnie Cinématographique; RTBF
- Distributed by: Mars Distribution
- Release dates: 17 November 2012 (Sarlat Film Festival); 28 November 2012 (France)
- Running time: 111 minutes
- Countries: France; Belgium
- Language: French
- Budget: $16 million
- Box office: $12.7 million

Populaire is a 2012 romantic comedy film co-written and directed by Régis Roinsard. The film's title is taken from the name of the typewriter, Japy Populaire, used in the film. Set in the late 1950s, the film follows Rose Pamphyle (Déborah François), a secretary who is trained by her new boss, Louis Échard (Romain Duris), to win the world speed typing contest in New York City. Populaire was released in France on 28 November 2012.

== Plot ==
In 1958, Rose Pamphyle lives in Saint-Fraimbault with her father, a gruff widower who wants her to marry the son of a local mechanic. Against her father's wishes, Rose travels to Lisieux and applies for a job as a secretary for insurance agent Louis Échard. Louis is initially unimpressed, but after learning that Rose can type incredibly fast, using only two fingers, he hires her for a week on a trial basis.

When Rose turns out to be a clumsy and disorganised secretary, Louis tells her that she must compete in that year's regional speed typing championship to keep her job. He makes a bet with his American best friend, Bob Taylor—who is married to Louis' former flame, Marie—that Rose can win the regional championship. While Rose makes the finals, she ultimately loses her first typing championship.

Rose temporarily moves in with Louis so he can train her to become the fastest typist in the world. He teaches her to type with all 10 fingers and arranges for her to take piano lessons from Marie to strengthen her fingers. As Rose struggles to learn to type with 10 fingers, Louis encourages her by colour-coding the keys on her typewriter and teaching her better posture. Over time, she excels and the two grow close.

Rose wins the 1959 regional championship, becoming the fastest typist in Lower Normandy. Since his family is visiting for Christmas, Louis sends Rose home. Not wanting to reunite with her father, Rose shows up at Bob and Marie's house that evening. Marie promptly drives Rose to Louis' doorstep and introduces her to his family as his fiancée. Louis plays along, and his parents are taken with Rose. It becomes obvious to Bob and Marie that Louis and Rose are attracted to each other, but Louis does not want to distract Rose from the championship.

Louis and Rose travel to Paris together, and the night before the national championship, they confess their love for each other and have sex. Competing against the current national champion, Rose makes it to the finals but struggles under the pressure. Shortly before Rose's final match, Louis tells her that he had been lying to her, revealing that he had secretly noticed that her typing speed is regularly faster than her opponent's best record. Angered by his deceit, Rose wins. She later tells Louis she loves him, but he claims he only slept with her to help her win the championship.

Heartbroken, Rose stays in Paris, where she becomes a celebrity sponsored by Japy, a major typewriter manufacturer. She becomes the spokesperson for Japy's brand-new pink typewriter, the Populaire, which she uses to prepare for the world championship, though she finds the keyboard too small. Rose still calls Louis regularly, although he never answers the phone. She becomes romantically involved with Gilbert Japy and travels to New York City for the world typing championship.

Struggling with his own feelings, Louis asks Marie why she chose Bob over him. She replies that Bob proposed a life together, while Louis left for World War II. Louis explains that he could never give Rose the smile and happiness she had when she won in Paris—the same smile that he saw on Marie the day she married Bob. Marie tells Louis she was smiling because she felt loved. She encourages him to overcome his fear.

Louis flies to New York with Bob to support Rose in the world championship. They arrive just before the second round of the finals ends. As the judges announce the results, Rose is behind and struggling. When Gilbert attempts to dissuade Louis from seeing Rose, Louis punches Gilbert and follows Rose, who runs backstage to retrieve her old typewriter. Louis professes his love for her, and they kiss.

Rose takes the stage for the last round, seemingly energised by her love for Louis. Although her typewriter jams halfway through the match, she quickly recovers and wins the championship, being declared the world's fastest typist. On stage, Louis and Rose kiss and hold hands as the audience cheers.

== Cast ==
- Romain Duris as Louis Échard
- Déborah François as Rose Pamphyle
- Bérénice Bejo as Marie Taylor
- Shaun Benson as Bob Taylor
- Mélanie Bernier as Annie Leprince-Ringuet
- Nicolas Bedos as Gilbert Japy
- Miou-Miou as Madeleine Échard
- Eddy Mitchell as Georges Échard
- Frédéric Pierrot as Jean Pamphyle
- Féodor Atkine as Edmond Japy
- Dominique Reymond as Madamme Shorofsky
- Jeanne Cohendy as Françoise
- Marius Colucci as Lucien Échard
- Yannik Landrein as Léonard Échard
- Emeline Bayart as Jacqueline Échard
- Nastassja Girard as Evelyne Échard
- Joan Mompart as the cha-cha-chá singer
- Serpentine Teyssier as Mrs. Teyssier, the owner of the boarding house for young women
- Sara Haskell as Susan Hunter
- Pauline Morro as Simone Taylor
- Hugo de Sousa as Joe Taylor
- Caroline Tillette as the vamp
- Fanny Sidney as a fan in the regional championship

== Production ==
=== Casting ===
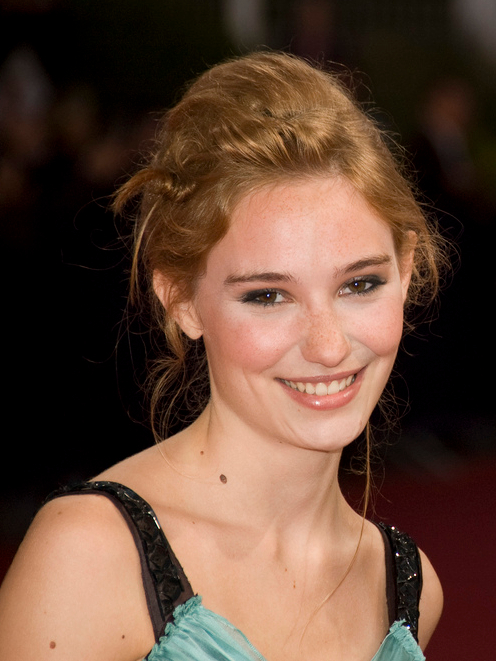
Belgian actress Déborah François plays Rose Pamphyle.

Roinsard was planning to cast an unknown actress in the lead role of Rose Pamphyle, but chose Belgian actress Déborah François after she impressed him in her audition. After asking her father to find a typewriter for her, François practised for a week before the audition. She told Georgia Dehn from The Daily Telegraph, "I was so fast at the audition that everyone watching asked whether I had done it much before. Of course I didn't admit to practising. I told them, 'I'm just really motivated, I really want the part, I'm ready for competition.'" François believed that she connected with Rose as soon as she finished reading the script. She loved Rose's clumsiness and thought she was a bit like herself. François underwent six months of professional typing coaching before filming commenced. She had to practice for up to three hours every day. The actress explained that as they wanted it to be real, nothing is speeded up in the film and her hands are featured in every scene.

Romain Duris was cast as Louis Échard. Duris was initially concerned about whether the costumes and style would take over, causing the film to be stuck in the past. He said he needed the film to feel live and real. The actor watched several films starring Cary Grant and James Stewart as well as French classics directed by Marcel Carné and Claude Chabrol to see the differences between the provinces and Paris and the ways in which people behaved and spoke in the 1950s.

=== Costume design ===
Costume designer Charlotte David created and designed many of the clothes for the film. David previously created costumes for OSS 117: Cairo, Nest of Spies, which was also set in France in the fifties. Laure Guilbault from Women's Wear Daily reported that the look of Populaire was inspired by Funny Face, The Seven Year Itch and Alfred Hitchcock films. François revealed that she gave her own input for the costumes, saying "I loved being involved in the creation of costumes. I could say that these suspenders should be thinner, or this skirt should be worn with an extra petticoat, or have a bow added." David thought the right lingerie was crucial to the look and pointy bras, girdles and bodices were used to underpin the silhouettes. Some of the lingerie was made by Parisian corsetry house Cadolle.

As Rose is "a young provincial woman", she often wears pretty dresses, while Bejo's character Marie, who is married to an American man, has a casual early Sixties look. David explained that she wanted Marie to be a modern woman and she found printed fabrics for her costumes at De Gilles, a fabric shop in Paris, which she used to make short pants. She then completed the look with silk knit jerseys, ballet shoes, headbands and tight cardigans. Lelia Delval, the hairstylist for Populaire, gave Bejo a red wig to wear, which the actress liked so much, she dyed her real hair red for her next film. The men wore tailor-made suits and tie clips. Duris' character Louis sports a vintage Jaeger-LeCoultre watch.

=== Music ===
The musical score of the film was written by French artists Rob and Emmanuel d'Orlando. The soundtrack also uses pre-existing music tracks. It was released on 28 November 2012. Roinsard decided to use music from three years before and after the year in which the film takes place. When choosing the pre-existing music, Roinsard combined his love of American lounge music, light jazz and '50s composers with French songs by lesser-known artists such as Jack Ary, Jacqueline Boyer and Les Chaussettes Noires, whose singer Eddy Mitchell appears in the film. Roinsard thought Rob and Emmanuel d'Orlando's score added "great emotional impact to the film." The director was inspired by both '50s and '60s recording methods for the score, which was recorded in France. Roinsard added "The end result is close to a musical and I'm delighted since Stanley Donen and Bob Fosse are favourites of mine."

== Release ==
Populaire had its world premiere at the Sarlat Film Festival. It was then released in France on 28 November 2012. Populaire played at the Glasgow Film Festival in February, before it was released in the UK on 31 May 2013. The film was released on 6 September 2013 in the United States.

== Reception ==
=== Critical response ===
Populaire earned €406,295 upon its opening weekend in France. The film opened to 450 theatres and landed at number three in the French box office top 10. As of 28 May 2013, Populaire has grossed $5,315,819 worldwide.

The review aggregator website Rotten Tomatoes reported a 72% approval rating with an average rating of 6.6/10 based on 60 reviews. The website's consensus reads, "The cheerfully frothy Populaire may lack substance, but its visual appeal – and director Roinsard's confident evocation of 1950s filmmaking tropes – help carry the day." Metacritic, which assigns a score of 1–100 to individual film reviews, gave Populaire an average rating of 58 based on 25 reviews, indicating "mixed or average reviews".

Jérôme Vermelin from Metro France commented "Full of charm, this first film by young director Régis Roinsard is carried by an irresistible duo of Romain Duris and Deborah François." Liz Beardsworth from Empire gave Populaire three stars and wrote "Roinsard keeps control of a film that vacillates between frothy fun and more serious social comment and cleverly uses subplots and supporting characters (including The Artist's Bérénice Bejo) to touch on weightier themes. Quaint, but charming."

IndieWire's Kaleem Aftab awarded the film a B− and stated "With a great cast and sufficient laughs, Populaire could find international audiences, but it's no Amelie. The orthodox script will not broaden appeal outside the dedicated romcom market and the language barrier may also be a problem for some." Boyd van Hoeij, writing for Variety, said the film is "a colorful and impeccably styled romantic comedy that manages to turn the speed-typing competitions of the 1950s into entertaining cinematic fodder." He went on to praise the performances of Duris and François, but thought the story did not quite take any unexpected turns or reveal any deeper emotions.

=== Accolades ===
Award	Category	Recipients and nominees	Result
Athens Francophone Film Festival	Audience Award	Populaire	Won
César Award	Best Cinematography	Guillaume Schiffman	Nominated
César Award	Best Costume Design	Charlotte David	Nominated
César Award	Best First Feature Film	Régis Roinsard	Nominated
César Award	Best Music Written for a Film	Rob and Emmanuel d'Orlando	Nominated
César Award	Best Production Design	Sylvie Olivé	Nominated
City of Lights, City of Angels Festival	First Feature Award	Populaire – Régis Roinsard	Won
French Film Awards	Director-producer duo	Régis Roinsard and Alain Attal	Won
French Film Festival in Japan	Audience Prize	Populaire	Won
Globes de Cristal Award	Best Actress	Déborah François	Nominated
Magritte Award	Best Foreign Film in Coproduction		Nominated
Magritte Award	Best Actress	Déborah François	Nominated
San Francisco Film Festival	Best Narrative Feature	Populaire	Won
