= Ergonomic glove =

Wrist support for typing

An ergonomic glove, also known as a computer glove or support glove, is a stiff glove worn to try to prevent or remedy carpal tunnel syndrome by holding the wrist in a certain position while typing.
