= UCT (disambiguation) =

UCT is the University of Cape Town, a public research university in Cape Town, South Africa.

UCT may also refer to:

== Chemistry ==
- Upper consolute temperature, the critical temperature above which the components of a mixture are miscible in all proportions

== Places ==
- Temuco Catholic University (Spanish: Universidad Católica de Temuco)
- Ukhta Airport
- University of Chemistry and Technology, Prague

== Other uses ==
- Upper Confidence Tree (upper confidence bounds applied to trees), a Monte Carlo tree search algorithm
- Unconditional cash transfer
- Coordinated Universal Time (UTC, of which UCT is a deprecated alias)

== See also ==
- UTC (disambiguation)
