= Frank E. McGurrin =

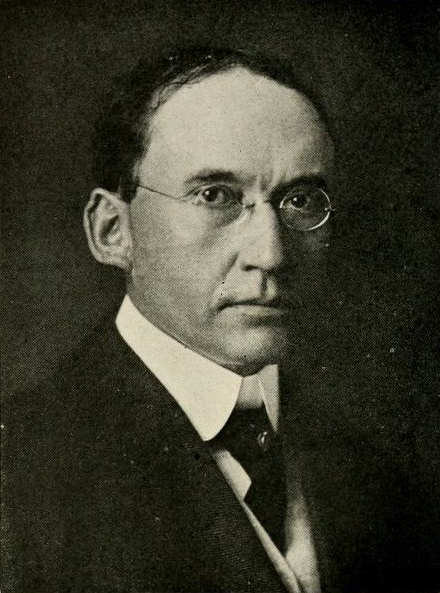
- Born: April 2, 1861; Grand Rapids, Michigan
- Died: August 17, 1933 (aged 72); Oakland, California
- Partner: Jane Darling McGurrin

Frank Edward McGurrin (April 2, 1861 – August 17, 1933) invented touch typing in 1888. He was a court stenographer at Salt Lake City who taught typing classes. He taught himself to touch type without looking at the keys, before challenging and winning a competition.

== History ==
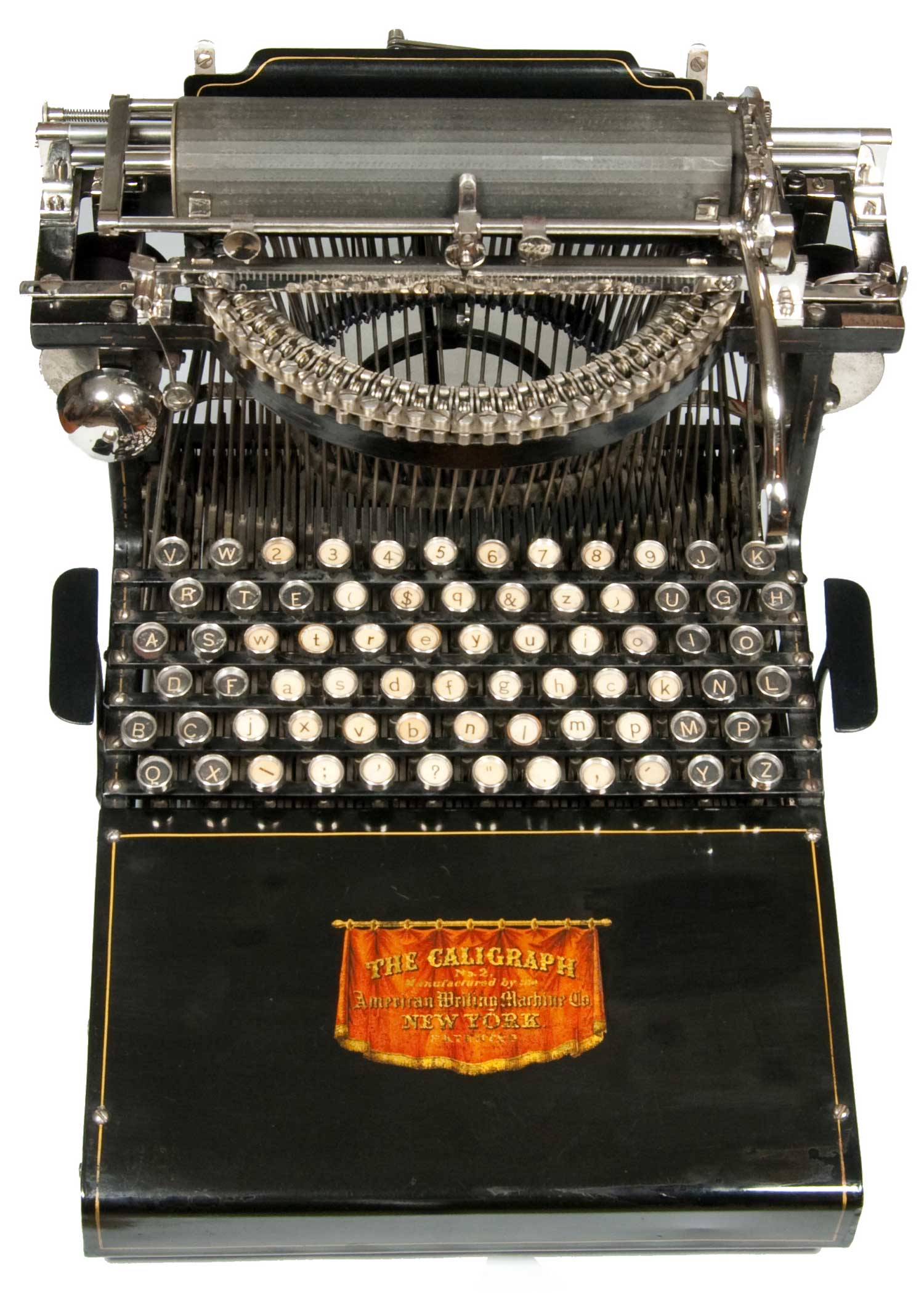
Caligraph 2 typewriter, 1882

On July 25, 1888, McGurrin, who was purportedly the only person using touch typing at the time, won a decisive victory over Louis Traub (operating Caligraph with eight-finger method) in a typing contest held in Cincinnati. The results were displayed on the front pages of many newspapers. McGurrin won $500 (worth $10,820 in 2006) and popularized the new typing method.

Whether McGurrin was actually the first person to touch type, or simply the first to be popularly noticed, is disputed. Speeds attained by other typists in other typing competitions at the time suggest that they must have been using similar systems.

== The first touch operator ==
The following story of how McGurrin came to operate the typewriter by "touch" is told in his own words:

I first began using the method in 1878 under the following circumstances. I was a clerk in the law office of D. E. Corbitt, in Grand Rapids, Michigan. He bought a second-hand No. 1 (Remington) Typewriter, with the tin front and back, on which the carriage was pulled back by a string and a sledgehammer blow was required to depress the keys. My employer and I began practicing on it at the same time and there was quite a rivalry between us for some months as to who could write the faster. Those were my first typewriting contests. Before long I could beat him so easily that he give up the struggle. One day he came into the office and told some on else who was there that he had just been over to the office of Henry F. Welch, was dictating from his notes to a girl who was running the typewriter while looking out of the window. All this while she was writing from dictation at a very rapid rate. I afterwards learned that this was a fairy tale and only told in my presence to take the conceit out of me. However, boy like, I made up my mind that whatever a girl could do I could do, so I set to work to learn to operate without looking at the keyboard. I discarded my former method of two or three fingers and determined to use all of my fingers. Before the end of the year 1878 I could write upwards of 90 words a minute in new matter without looking at the keyboard. I did not meet the girl in Mr. Welch’s office for two years after and then learned to my surprise that she did not operate the machine without looking at the keyboard and had never attempted to do so. I do not take any great credit for having thought of operating without looking at the keyboard for it is simply a matter of common sense, and the system of fingering is so simple that anybody could formulate it. Mr. Welch is still the court reporter at Grand Rapids and can vouch for the fact that as early as 1878, I was operating the machine by touch.

— Frank Edward McGurrin

Corbitt's effort "to take the conceit out of" McGurrin resulted in the development of an operator who was the first to demonstrate that "touch" typewriting was not an unattainable ideal, but could actually be accomplished with a saving of time and labor. This new achievement in typewriter operating immediately attracted wide attention. Theodore C. Rose, Vice-President of the International Convention of Shorthand Writers, at the meeting at Chicago on September 1, 1881, made the following reference to McGurrin's work: "I would say that in the past week I was in the office of Walsh & Ford, in Grand Rapids, and that a young man in their office, on a test, wrote ninety-seven words on the type-writer, and read the copy. He did not look at the machine, at all, but kept his eye on the copy. I know he wrote ninety-seven words in a minute, because I held the watch." This utterance is also notable because it is probably the first reference to what we now know as the "touch system" contained in the reports of any of the conventions.
