= Audio typist =

Person who transcribes voice to text

An audio typist is someone who specialises in typing text from a vocal source which they listen to. The original voice document is usually recorded onto microcassettes by someone dictating into a Dictaphone. The audio typist will have learnt to touch type at a high speed which means they can look at the monitor or keep an eye on a waiting area as they are typing because they do not need to look at the keyboard. A specialist player called a micro cassette transcriber (below) is used for playback of the cassettes to maximise the typing speed.

An audio typist or a secretary with this skill will quote their speed in words per minute (abbreviated to wpm) on their CV and may be asked to demonstrate their speed and accuracy of this skill as part of the interview or application process.

== Micro Cassette Transcriber ==
Typical features include; headphones, foot pedals, adjustable speed control, tape counter, backspace feature, pause, search.

The headphones allow several typists to work near to each other. The foot pedals ensure hand free operation of the player freeing up the hands to type almost non stop. The pedals can be used to rewind the tape by 5 to 10 seconds (backspace feature) or pause the tape.

== Stenographer ==
A stenographer usually uses a special machine to type a kind of shorthand of what was said in court and they are not considered to be an audio typist. See Court Reporter for further information.

== Transcriptionist ==
A transcriptionist is similar to an audio typist, but the audio source is more likely to be a recording of someone speaking naturally instead of a dictation. They are more likely to work at home because they usually have no secretarial or administrative duties. Work was traditionally delivered to their desk (or home) by micro cassette but nowadays they might be given video tapes, CDs, DVDs, electronic files, etc. The work will be varied and they may be asked to type up transcripts from TV shows, interviews, talks, lectures and meetings, etc.

== Medical work ==
A medical audio typist usually types up clinical letters and notes from dictation of patients' appointments, tests, operations and procedures and may work in a hospital or health centre for one or more clinicians. They may also type non-medical letters and perform other office duties such as sort mail and patient test results, answer phonecalls and provide cover for medical secretaries/personal assistants in their absence.

A medical secretary is a secretary/personal assistant who manages the office and administrative matters of doctors, consultants and surgeons in a hospital or clinical setting. They may work for one or more clinicians. Medical secretaries/PAs manage diaries, arrange and attend both general and clinical meetings to take notes and minutes, manage waiting lists - adding patients onto lists for different procedures, co-ordinating the admission and ensuring the patient has the necessary information and instruction, type up clinical and general letters from dictation, deal with phonecalls and receive and sort mail and patient test results. A medical secretary/PA may supervise, train and manage clerical staff and audio typists and perform their appraisals and annual review. As well as a general secretarial qualifications a Medical Secretary/PA usually holds a medical secretarial diploma or other specialised qualifications.

The Association of Medical Secretaries, Practice Managers, Administrators & Receptionists offers qualifications to people working in the United Kingdom

== Copy Typist ==
See copy typist for someone who uses a written or printed source for the documents they are typing.

== See also ==
- Personal assistant
- Receptionist
- Secretary
- Administrator
- Data entry clerk
