= Touch Typist Typing Tutor =

Typing tutor software

- Developer: Sector Software
- Initial release: 1985; 40 years ago
- Stable release: 1.27 / December 2008
- Operating system: Microsoft Windows
- Website: www.typingtutor.co.uk

Touch Typist Typing Tutor is developed by Sector Software.

Touch Typist typing tutor is the earliest example of typing tutor software currently still on sale. The software was written and released for sale in 1985 on the Sinclair QL computer. Its first public sale was at The ZX Microfair in 1985. This was a very popular computer show held in The Horticultural Halls, Elverton Street, London, England. The ZX Microfair was a showcase for all manner of software and hardware related to the Sinclair range of computers. The software was also first advertised as a small classified advert in QL World magazine, but soon became a flagship product for the company formed to sell it, Sector Software.

Touch Typist soon went on sale in WH Smiths as well as in many smaller computer shops which were supplied by the now defunct company Terry Blood Distribution Ltd.

The software was originally written in QL Basic on the Sinclair QL, this was compiled with the Digital Precision Superbasic Compiler and released on Sinclair Microdrive cartridges for the Sinclair QL computer. Microdrive cartridges were small cartridges similar to an 8 track tape, with a continuous loop of tape which could hold 100KB of code.

The software was soon converted to run on other computers including the Atari ST, Commodore Amiga, Acorn Archimedes, Cambridge Computers Z88 Portable computer and Microsoft Windows based computers.

Touch Typist has been on continuous sale and been continually developed by the original author David Batty and is still published by the original company, Sector Software of Leyland Lancashire.

The current version of the software is written in Microsoft Visual Basic, versions for other platforms have all been written in other versions of compiled BASIC.

The software features very short lessons, each less than 55 characters long. With feedback after every lesson. The very short lessons with plenty of feedback give the software a 'game' feel.

The first version of the software had a Space Invaders game built into it that the users were allowed to play once for every 20 lessons they completed. The Sinclair QL had 128KB of memory, but after the operating system had taken its share of it, only 97KB were left for programs to run. Touch Typist was 95K in size so there was only 2KB of memory left in which to add a game. In order to include a game without losing anything from the software, a space invaders game was written in MC68000 machine code, the whole game and graphics took just 2K of memory. The game was removed in second and subsequent versions after requests from various schools who were using the software, for a version without an arcade game in it.

The software is currently sold to schools, colleges, businesses and private individuals around the world from its website. The software is distributed either on a CD for Microsoft Windows-based machines, or via a download and on-line unlocking method.
