= Muscle memory (strength training) =

Observed ability of muscles

Muscle memory in strength training and weight-lifting is the effect that trained athletes experience of a rapid return of muscle mass and strength after long periods of inactivity.

The mechanisms implied for the muscle memory suggest that it is mainly related to strength training, and a 2016 study conducted at Karolinska Institutet in Stockholm, Sweden failed to find a memory effect of endurance training. However, later research has expanded this concept; a 2026 study demonstrated that high‑intensity interval training (HIIT) does induce an epigenetic memory (via DNA methylation) that persists for months, suggesting memory mechanisms differ between exercise modalities.

== Background ==
Until recently such effects were attributed solely to muscle memory in motor learning occurring in the central nervous system. Long-term effects of previous training on the muscle fibers themselves, however, have recently also been observed related to strength training.

Until recently it was generally assumed that the effects of exercise on muscle was reversible, and that after a long period of de-training the muscle fibers returned to their previous state. For strength training this view was challenged in 2010 by using in vivo imaging techniques revealing specific long lasting structural changes in muscle fibers after a strength-training episode.

== Implications ==
The notion of a memory mechanism residing in muscle fibers might have implications for health related exercise advice, and for exclusion times after doping offences.

== Cell nuclei and muscle fibers ==
Muscle memory is probably related to the cell nuclei residing inside the muscle fibers.

The muscle cells are the largest cells in the body with a volume thousands of times larger than most other body cells. To support this large volume, the muscle cells are one of the very few in the mammalian body that contain several cell nuclei. Such multinucleated cells are called syncytia. Strength-training increases muscle mass and force mainly by changing the caliber of each fiber rather than increasing the number of fibers. During such fiber enlargement muscle stem cells in the muscle tissue multiply and fuse with pre-existing fibers as to support the larger cellular volume. It has often been assumed that each nucleus can support a certain volume of cytoplasm, and hence that there is a constant volume domain served by each nucleus, although recent evidence suggests that this is an oversimplification. Until 2008 it was believed that during muscle wasting, muscle cells lost nuclei by a nuclear self-destruct mechanism called apoptosis, but observations using time lapse in vivo imaging in mice do not support this model. Direct observation indicated that no nuclei are lost under such conditions, and the apoptosis observed in the muscle tissue were demonstrated to occur only in other cell nuclei in the tissue, e.g. connective tissue and muscle stem cells called satellite cells. Since in vivo imaging has confirmed that cell nuclei are added during strength training and not lost upon subsequent detraining, the nuclei might provide a mechanism for muscle memory. Thus, upon retraining the extra nuclei are already there and can rapidly start synthesizing new proteins to build muscle mass and strength.

The extra muscle nuclei obtained by a strength training episode seems to be very long lasting, perhaps permanent, even in muscles that are inactive for a long time. The ability to recruit new nuclei is impaired in the elderly, so it might be beneficial to strength train before senescence.

== Doping ==
Doping with anabolic steroids also seem to act partly by recruiting new nuclei. It was recently shown in mice that a brief exposure to anabolic steroids recruited new muscle nuclei. When the steroids were withdrawn, the muscle rapidly shrank to normal size, but the extra nuclei remained. After a waiting period of 3 months (about 15% of the mouse lifespan), overload exercise led to a muscle growth of 36% within 6 days in the steroid-exposed group, while control muscles that had never been exposed to steroids grew only insignificantly. Since nuclei are long lasting structures in muscle, this suggests that anabolic steroids might have long lasting if not permanent effects on the ability to grow muscle mass.

Recent evidence has pointed towards epigenetics as a plausible mechanism by which muscle may remember an initial bout of resistance/strength training. Indeed, via the retention of hypomethylated modifications to DNA, a recent study identified an enhanced morphological adaptation to a 7-week bout of resistance exercise, following an initial 7 week training phase and detraining phase.
