= Association of Medical Secretaries, Practice Managers, Administrators and Receptionists =

The Association of Medical Secretaries, Practice Managers, Administrators and Receptionists (AMSPAR) was founded in 1964 as the Association of Medical Secretaries (AMS). It is based in Tavistock Square adjacent to the British Medical Association.

It is concerned with professional standards of competence for medical secretaries, medical receptionists, administrators and practice managers. It offers 14 qualifications for General Practice staff in the UK working with the City and Guilds of London Institute. AMSPAR qualifications appear to be recognised widely in the NHS.

Tom Brownlie is the chief executive officer.

It is a private company limited by guarantee and a registered charity.
