= Copy typist =

Person who transcribes manuscript to type

A copy typist is someone who specializes in typing text from a source which they read. Originally appearing as a skill in handling of a typewriter, later it transitioned to using a computer keyboard, with results tracking on a computer display and obtained using a printer. Before introduction of computers, an additional skill of proofreading and document editing were critical.

== Professional overview ==
Copy typists learn to touch type at a high speed, which means they can look at the copy they are typing instead of the keyboard they are typing on.

The source, or original document is called the copy. They have the document to be typed in front of them and the copy is often held in a copyholder. The adjustable arm on the copyholder aids legibility and maximizes the typing speed. There could also be an adjustable ruler and marker to help the typist keep their position when they are interrupted, clips to hold the pages in place, and a light. Elaborate varieties can even be adjusted by height or angle and some come with rulers and guides that appear over the front of the page.

The copy can be hand written notes perhaps from an author of a book, a play, or a TV show. It might be their own notes in shorthand — perhaps minutes from a meeting or notes from a talk, lecture, or presentation. In the past when word processors were not available and few people could type they would have typed up dissertations, research papers, and letters that had been hand written by the authors. An urgent letter which was typed up was often signed by the secretary with a pp or was otherwise given back to the sender to sign before dispatch.

A copy typist or a secretary with this skill will quote their speed in words per minute (abbreviated to wpm) on their curriculum vitae and may be asked to demonstrate their speed and accuracy of this skill as part of the interview or application process.

== See also ==
- Audio typist
- Business administration
- Data entry clerk
- Scrivener
- Manuscript
