= Speed typing contest =

Typing speed competition

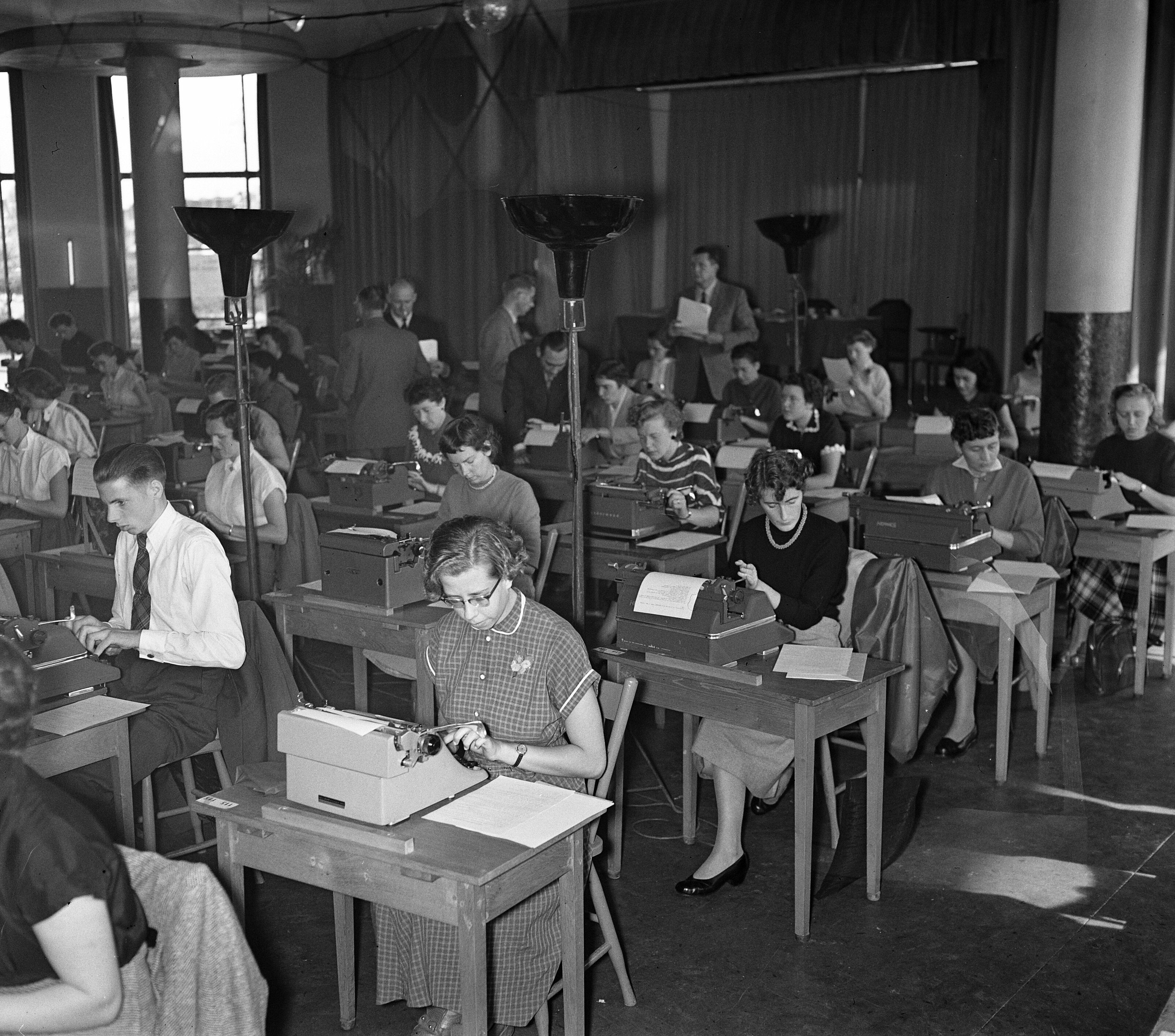
Dutch National Championship in 1954

In a speed typing contest contestants compete to attain the highest accurate typing speeds. These contests have been common in North America since the 1930s and were used to test the relative efficiency of typing with the Dvorak and QWERTY keyboard layouts.

== In popular culture ==
The 2012 French romantic comedy-drama film Populaire shows the relationship between a speed typist and her trainer.

== See also ==
- Ultimate Typing Championship
