= United Theological College =

United Theological College may refer to

- United Theological College, Aberystwyth
- United Theological College, Bangalore
- United Theological College of the West Indies
- United Theological College (Montreal), a theological college of the United Church of Canada
- United Theological College (Sydney), the theological college of the Uniting Church in Australia, Synod of New South Wales and the ACT

== See also ==
- United Theological Seminary (Trotwood, Ohio)
- United Theological Seminary of the Twin Cities
- Union Theological College (Belfast)
- United Faculty of Theology (Melbourne)
