= Muscle memory =

Consolidating a motor task into memory through repetition

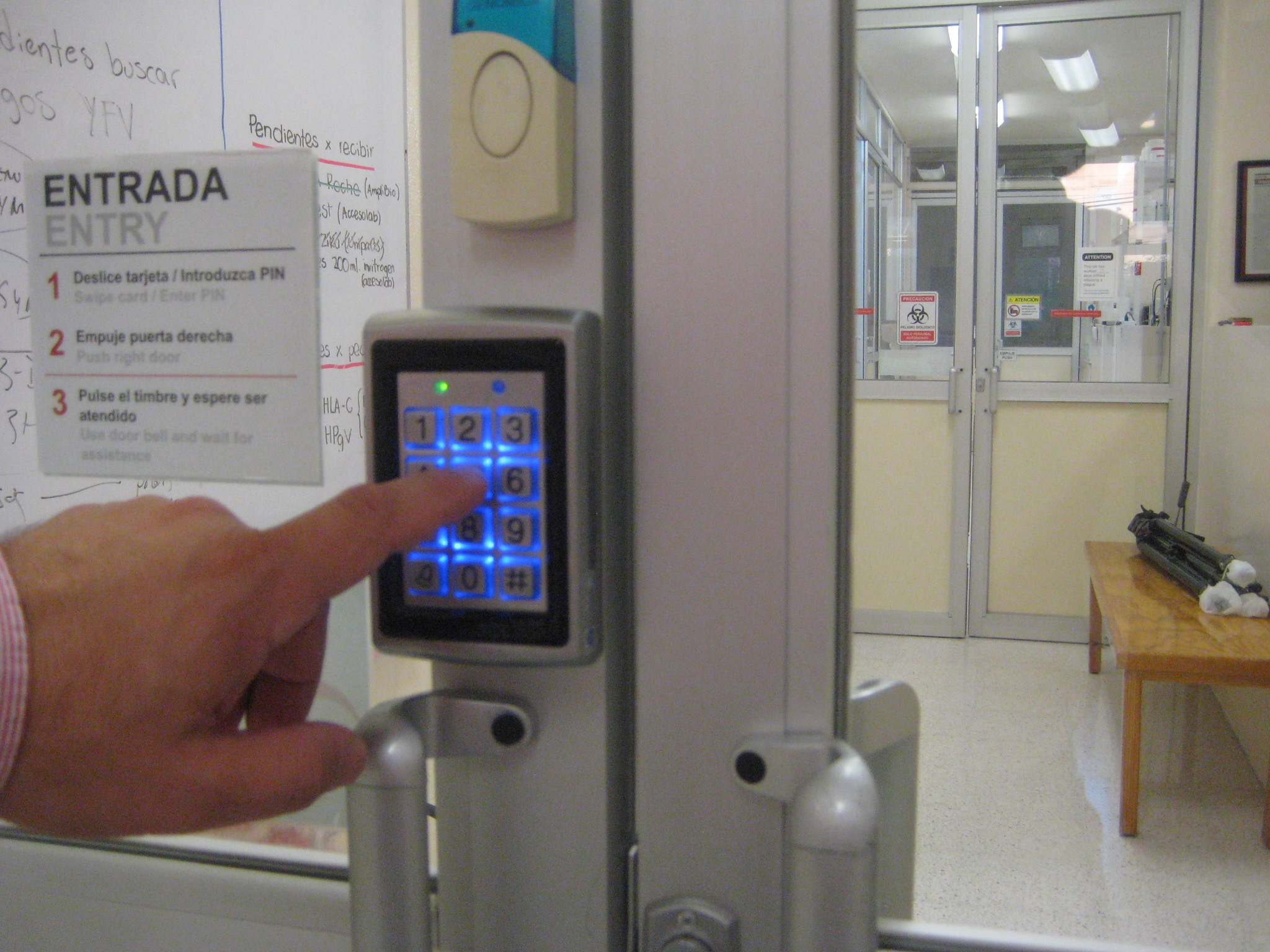
Entering the same code into a keypad may, over time, become a muscle memory

Muscle memory is a form of procedural memory that involves consolidating a specific motor task into memory through repetition, which has been used synonymously with motor learning. When a movement is repeated over time, the brain creates a long-term muscle memory for that task, eventually allowing it to be performed with little to no conscious effort. This process decreases the need for attention and creates maximum efficiency within the motor and memory systems. Muscle memory is found in many everyday activities that become automatic and improve with practice, such as riding bikes, driving motor vehicles, playing ball sports, musical instruments, and poker, touch-typing on keyboards, entering PINs, performing martial arts, swimming, dancing, and drawing.

== History ==
The origins of research for the acquisition of motor skills stem from philosophers such as Plato, Aristotle and Galen. After the break from tradition of the pre-1900s view of introspection, psychologists emphasized research and more scientific methods in observing behaviours. Thereafter, numerous studies exploring the role of motor learning were conducted. Such studies included the research of handwriting, and various practice methods to maximize motor learning.

=== Retention ===
The retention of motor skills, now referred to as muscle memory, also began to be of great interest in the early 1900s. Most motor skills are thought to be acquired through practice; however, more observation of the skill has led to learning as well. Research suggests we do not start off with a blank slate with regard to motor memory although we do learn most of our motor memory repertoire during our lifetime. Movements such as facial expressions, which are thought to be learned, can actually be observed in children who are blind; thus there is some evidence for motor memory being genetically pre-wired.

In Edward Thorndike, a leading pioneer in the study of motor memory, was among the first to acknowledge learning can occur without conscious awareness. One of the earliest and most notable studies regarding the retention of motor skills was by Hill, Rejall, and Thorndike, who showed savings in relearning typing skills after a 25-year period with no practice. Findings related to the retention of learned motor skills have been continuously replicated in studies, suggesting that through subsequent practice, motor learning is stored in the brain as memory. This is why performing skills such as riding a bike or driving a car are effortlessly and 'subconsciously' executed, even if someone had not performed these skills in a long period of time.

== Physiology ==
=== Motor behavior ===
When first learning a motor task, movement is often slow, stiff and easily disrupted without attention. With practice, execution of the motor task becomes smoother, there is a decrease in limb stiffness, and the muscle activity necessary to the task is performed without conscious effort.

=== Muscle memory encoding ===
The neuroanatomy of memory is widespread throughout the brain; however, the pathways important to motor memory are separate from the medial temporal lobe pathways associated with declarative memory. As with declarative memory, motor memory is theorized to have two stages: a short-term memory encoding stage, which is fragile and susceptible to damage, and a long-term memory consolidation stage, which is more stable.

The memory encoding stage is often referred to as motor learning, and requires an increase in brain activity in motor areas as well as an increase in attention. Brain areas active during motor learning include the motor and somatosensory cortices; however, these areas of activation decrease once the motor skill is learned. The prefrontal and frontal cortices are also active during this stage due to the need for increased attention on the task being learned.

The main area involved in motor learning is the cerebellum. Some models of cerebellar-dependent motor learning, in particular the Marr-Albus model, propose a single plasticity mechanism involving the cerebellar long-term depression (LTD) of the parallel fiber synapses onto Purkinje cells. These modifications in synapse activity would mediate motor input with motor outputs critical to inducing motor learning. However, conflicting evidence suggests that a single plasticity mechanism is not sufficient and a multiple plasticity mechanism are needed to account for the storage of motor memories over time. Regardless of the mechanism, studies of cerebellar-dependent motor tasks show that cerebral cortical plasticity is crucial for motor learning, even if not necessarily for storage.

The basal ganglia also play an important role in memory and learning, in particular in reference to stimulus-response associations and the formation of habits. The basal ganglia-cerebellar connections are thought to increase with time when learning a motor task.

=== Muscle memory consolidation ===
Muscle memory consolidation involves the continuous evolution of neural processes after practicing a task has stopped. The exact mechanism of motor memory consolidation within the brain is controversial. However, most theories assume that there is a general redistribution of information across the brain from encoding to consolidation. Hebb's rule states that "synaptic connectivity changes as a function of repetitive firing." In this case, that would mean that the high amount of stimulation coming from practicing a movement would cause the repetition of firing in certain motor networks, presumably leading to an increase in the efficiency of exciting these motor networks over time.

While the exact location of muscle memory storage is not known, studies have suggested that it is the inter-regional connections that play the most important role in advancing motor memory encoding to consolidation, rather than decreases in overall regional activity. These studies have shown a weakened connection from the cerebellum to the primary motor area with practice, it is presumed, because of a decreased need for error correction from the cerebellum. However, the connection between the basal ganglia and the primary motor area is strengthened, suggesting the basal ganglia play an important role in the motor memory consolidation process.

=== Sleep effects on muscle memory ===
Sleep and quality habits are required for maximizing motor memory and motor skill consolidation. Sleep has been shown to consolidate motor skills acquired via the reactivation and consolidation of neural pathways. This is particularly beneficial with complex motor movements, where motor performance is improved following sleep.

Sleep duration and exercise also influence motor skill learning and memory. It has been proven through experiments that sleep after night training improves skill consolidation compared to morning training without sleep. This therefore implies that sleep is a time of heightened processing and consolidation of motor learning, allowing athletes and individuals maximizing their motor skills to attain maximum performance.

Furthermore, formal sleep therapies have also been discovered to enhance the performance of sports through enhanced reaction time, coordination, and overall execution of skills. Maintenance of proper quantities of sleep in addition to strict compliance to consistency in sleeping schedule can maximize the results of motor learning as well as support long-term memory for body skills. The application of sleep-based interventions, including following a constant sleeping pattern and minimizing disruptions to an absolute degree, can therefore be a significant assistant for the person who wants to optimize their motor capacity.

=== Exercise training, adaptations, and muscle memory ===
When participating in any sport, new motor skills and movement combinations are frequently being used and repeated. All sports require some degree of strength, endurance training, and skilled reaching in order to be successful in the required tasks. Muscle memory related to strength training involves elements of both motor learning, described below, and long-lasting changes in the muscle tissue.

Evidence has shown that increases in strength occur well before muscle hypertrophy, and decreases in strength due to detraining or ceasing to repeat the exercise over an extended period of time precede muscle atrophy. To be specific, strength training enhances motor neuron excitability and induces synaptogenesis, both of which would help in enhancing communication between the nervous system and the muscles themselves.

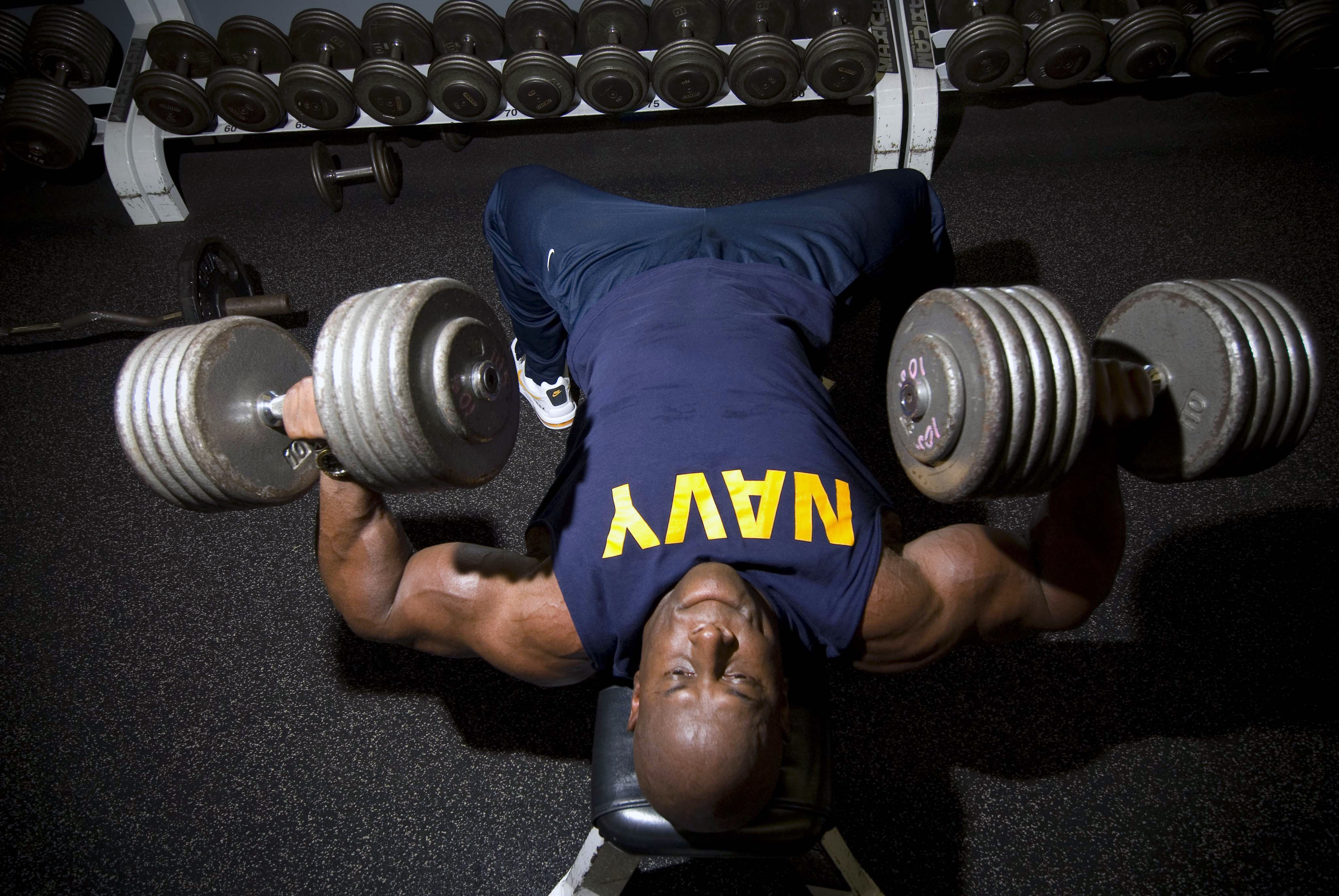

However, neuromuscular efficacy is not altered within a two-week time period following cessation of the muscle usage; instead, it is merely the neuron's ability to excite the muscle that declines in correlation with the muscle's decrease in strength. This confirms that muscle strength is first influenced by the inner neural circuitry, rather than by external physiological changes in the muscle size.

Previously untrained muscles will acquire newly formed nuclei through the fusion of satellite cells preceding hypertrophy. Subsequent detraining will result in atrophy and the loss of myo-nuclei. While it was long believed that a muscle memory effect related to myo-nuclei permanence existed, current studies establish that during detraining, myo-nuclei will be lost.

Reorganization of motor maps within the cortex are not altered in either strength or endurance training. However, within the motor cortex, endurance induces angiogenesis within as little as three weeks to increase blood flow to the involved regions. In addition, neurotropic factors within the motor cortex are upregulated in response to endurance training to promote neural survival.

Skilled motor tasks have been divided into two distinct phases: a fast-learning phase, in which an optimal plan for performance is established, and a slow-learning phase, in which longer-term structural modifications are made on specific motor modules. Even a small amount of training may be enough to induce neural processes that continue to evolve even after the training has stopped, which provides a potential basis for consolidation of the task. In addition, studying mice while they are learning a new complex reaching task, has found that "motor learning leads to rapid formation of dendritic spines (spinogenesis) in the motor cortex contralateral to the reaching forelimb". However, motor cortex reorganization itself does not occur at a uniform rate across training periods. It has been suggested that the synaptogenesis and motor map reorganization merely represent the consolidation, and not the acquisition itself, of a specific motor task. Furthermore, the degree of plasticity in various locations (namely motor cortex versus spinal cord) is dependent on the behavioural demands and nature of the task (i.e., skilled reaching versus strength training).

Whether strength or endurance related, it is plausible that the majority of motor movements would require a skilled moving task of some form, whether it be maintaining proper form when paddling a canoe, sitting with a neutral posture, or bench pressing a heavier weight. Endurance training assists the formation of these new neural representations within the motor cortex by up regulating neurotropic factors that could enhance the survival of the newer neural maps formed due to the skilled movement training. Strength training results are seen in the spinal cord well before any physiological muscular adaptation is established through muscle hypertrophy or atrophy. The results of endurance and strength training, and skilled reaching, therefore, combine to help each other maximize performance output.

More recently, research has suggested that epigenetics may play a distinct role in orchestrating a muscle memory phenomenon Indeed, previously untrained human participants experienced a chronic period of resistance exercise training (7 weeks) that evoked significant increases in skeletal muscle mass of the vastus lateralis muscle, in the quadriceps muscle group. Following a similar period of physical in-activity (7 weeks), where strength and muscle mass returned to baseline, participants performed a secondary period of resistance exercise. Importantly, these participants adapted in an enhanced manner, whereby the amount of skeletal muscle mass gained was greater in the second period of muscle growth than the first, suggesting a muscle memory concept. The researchers went on to examine the human epigenome in order to understand how DNA methylation may aid in creating this effect. During the first period of resistance exercise, the authors identify significant adaptations in the human methylome, whereby over 9,000 CpG sites were reported as being significantly hypomethylated, with these adaptations being sustained during the subsequent period of physical in-activity. However, upon secondary exposure to resistance exercise, a greater frequency of hypomethylated CpG sites was observed, where over 18,000 sites reported as being significantly hypomethylated. The authors went on to identify how these changes altered the expression of relevant transcripts, and subsequently correlated these changes with adaptations in skeletal muscle mass. Collectively, the authors conclude that skeletal muscle mass and muscle memory phenomenon is, at least in part, modulated due to changes in DNA methylation.

Expanding upon this emerging evidence, recent research has extended the concept of epigenetic muscle memory beyond resistance training to include high-intensity interval training (HIIT). A longitudinal repeated-training study found that human skeletal muscle retains aspects of an epigenetic memory following HIIT, with DNA methylation changes persisting after a 3-month detraining period despite physiological adaptations, including VO₂max, returning to pre-training levels. Thousands of differentially methylated positions remained hypomethylated, and five genes (ADAM19, INPP5A, MTHFD1L, CAPN2, and SLC16A3) retained both hypomethylation and increased expression following detraining. In contrast to findings reported after resistance training, these persistent epigenetic changes were not associated with enhanced physiological adaptations during retraining. HIIT and resistance training shared several epigenetic pathways, including focal adhesion, MAPK, and Rap1 signalling, but showed largely distinct sets of memory-associated genes, with only SRC and DDR1 common to both. These findings suggest that DNA hypomethylation may represent a conserved mechanism underlying epigenetic muscle memory, while the specific genes involved are influenced by the physiological demands of different exercise modalities.

== Fine motor memory ==
Fine motor skills are often discussed in terms of transitive movements, which are those done when using tools (which could be as simple as a tooth brush or pencil). Transitive movements have representations that become programmed to the premotor cortex, creating motor programs that result in the activation of the motor cortex and therefore the motor movements. In a study testing the motor memory of patterned finger movements (a fine motor skill) it was found that retention of certain skills is susceptible to disruption if another task interferes with one's motor memory. However, such susceptibility can be reduced with time. For example, if a finger pattern is learned and another finger pattern is learned six hours later, the first pattern will still be remembered. But attempting to learn two such patterns one immediately after the other could cause the first one to be forgotten. Furthermore, the heavy use of computers by recent generations has had both positive and negative effects. One of the main positive effects is an enhancement of children's fine motor skills. Repetitive behaviors, such as typing on a computer from a young age, can enhance such abilities. Therefore, children who learn to use computer keyboards at an early age could benefit from the early muscle memories.

=== Music memory ===
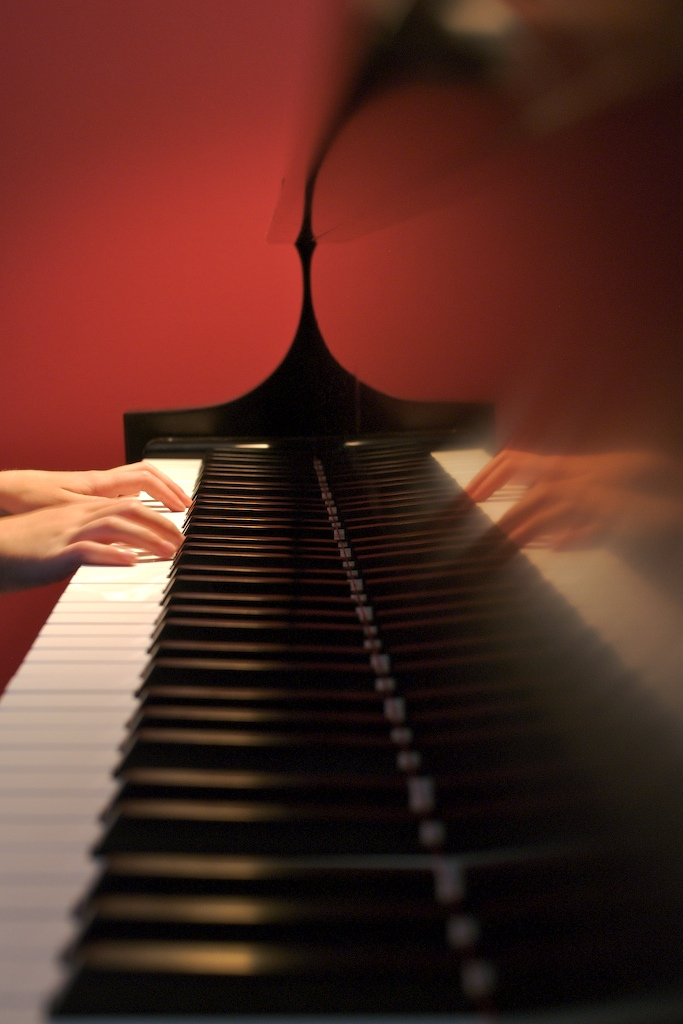
Playing the piano requires complex actions.

Fine motor skills are very important in playing musical instruments. Muscle memory is relied on when playing the clarinet, specifically to help create special effects through certain tongue movements when blowing air into the instrument.

Certain human behaviours, especially actions like the finger movements in musical performances, are very complex and require many interconnected neural networks where information can be transmitted across multiple brain regions. It has been found that there are often functional differences in the brains of professional musicians, when compared to other individuals. This is thought to reflect the musician's innate ability, which may be fostered by an early exposure to musical training. An example of this is bimanual synchronized finger movements, which play an essential role in piano playing. It is suggested that bimanual coordination can come only from years of bimanual training, where such actions become adaptations of the motor areas. When comparing professional musicians to a control group in complex bimanual movements, professionals are found to use an extensive motor network much less than those non-professionals. This is because professionals rely on a motor system that has increased efficiency, and, therefore, those less trained have a network that is more strongly activated. It is implied that the untrained pianists have to invest more neuronal activity to have the same level of performance that is achieved by professionals. This, yet again, is said to be a consequence of many years of motor training and experience that helps form a fine motor memory skill of musical performance.

It is often reported that, when a pianist hears a well-trained piece of music, synonymous fingering can be involuntarily triggered. This implies that there is a coupling between the perception of music and the motor activity of those musically trained individuals. Therefore, one's muscle memory in the context of music can easily be triggered when one hears certain familiar pieces. Overall, long-term musical fine motor training allows for complex actions to be performed at a lower level of movement control, monitoring, selection, attention, and timing. This leaves room for musicians to focus attention synchronously elsewhere, such as on the artistic aspect of the performance, without having to consciously control one's fine motor actions.

=== Puzzle cube memory ===
Erik Akkersdijk demonstrates speedcubing by solving a Rubik's Cube in under 11 seconds, 2010

Speed cubers use muscle memory when attempting to solve puzzle cubes, such as the Rubik's Cube, in the fastest possible time. Solving these puzzles in an efficient manner requires the cube to be manipulated according to a set of complex sequences of turns, called algorithms. By building their muscle memory of each algorithm's movements, speed cubers can implement them at very fast speeds without conscious effort. This plays a role in major speedcubing methods such as Fridrich for the 3×3×3 Rubik's Cube and EG for the 2×2×2 Pocket Cube.

== Gross motor memory ==
Gross motor skills are concerned with the movement of large muscles, or major body movements, such as those involved in walking or kicking, and are associated with normal development. The extent to which one exhibits gross motor skills depends largely on their muscle tone and the strength. In a study looking at people with Down Syndrome, it was found that the pre-existing deficits, with regard to verbal-motor performance, limits the individual's transfer of gross motor skills following visual and verbal instruction to verbal instruction only. The fact that the individuals could still exhibit two of the three original motor skills may have been a result of positive transfer in which previous exposure allows the individual to remember the motion, under the visual and verbal trial, and then later perform it under the verbal trial.

=== Learning in childhood ===
The way in which a child learns a gross motor skill can affect how long it takes to consolidate it and be able to reproduce the movement. In a study with preschoolers, looking at the role of self-instruction on acquiring complex gross motor chains using ballet positions, it was found that the motor skills were better learned and remembered with the self-instruction procedure over the no-self-instruction procedure. This suggests that the use of self-instruction will increase the speed with which a preschooler will learn and remember a gross motor skill. It was also found that once the preschoolers learned and mastered the motor chain movements, they ceased the use of self-instruction. This suggests that the memory for the movements became strong enough that there was no longer a need for self-instruction and the movements could be reproduced without it.

=== Effect of Alzheimer's disease ===
It has been suggested that consistent practice of a gross motor skill can help a patient with Alzheimer's disease learn and remember that skill. It was thought that the damage to the hippocampus may result in the need for a specific type of learning requirement. A study was created to test this assumption in which the patients were trained to throw a bean bag at a target. It was found that the Alzheimer's patients performed better on the task when learning occurred under constant training as opposed to variable. Also, it was found that gross motor memory in Alzheimer's patients was the same as that of healthy adults when learning occurs under constant practice. This suggests that damage to the hippocampal system does not impair an Alzheimer's patient from retaining new gross motor skills, implying that motor memory for gross motor skills is stored elsewhere in the brain. However there isn't much evidence provided on this.

== Impairment ==
It is difficult to display cases of "pure" motor memory impairment because the memory system is so widespread throughout the brain that damage is not often isolated to one specific type of memory. Likewise, diseases commonly associated with motor deficits, such as Huntington's and Parkinson's disease, have a wide variety of symptoms and associated brain damage that make it impossible to pinpoint whether or not motor memory is in fact impaired. Case studies have provided some examples of how motor memory has been implemented in patients with brain damage.

As Edward S. Casey notes in Remembering, Second Edition: A Phenomenological Study, declarative memory, a process that involves an initial fragile learning period. "The activity of the past, in short, resides in its habitual enactment in the present."

=== Consolidation deficit ===
A recent issue in motor memory is whether or not it consolidates in a manner similar to declarative memory, a process that involves an initial fragile learning period that eventually becomes stable and less susceptible to damage over time. An example of stable motor memory consolidation in a patient with brain damage is the case of Clive Wearing. Clive has severe anterograde and retrograde amnesia owing to damage in his temporal lobes, frontal lobes, and hippocampi, which prevents him from storing any new memories and making him aware of only the present moment. However, Clive still retains access to his procedural memories, to be specific, the motor memories involved in playing the piano. This could be because motor memory is demonstrated through savings over several trials of learning, whereas declarative memory is demonstrated through recall of a single item. This suggests that lesions in certain brain areas normally associated with declarative memory would not affect motor memory for a well-learned skill.

=== Dysgraphia for the alphabet ===
Case study: 54-year-old man with known history of epilepsy

This patient was diagnosed with a pure form of dysgraphia of letters, meaning he had no other speech or reading impairments. His impairment was specific to letters in the alphabet. He was able to copy letters from the alphabet, but he was not able to write these letters. He had previously been rated average on the Wechsler Adult Intelligence Scale's vocabulary subtest for writing ability comparative to his age before his diagnosis. His writing impairment consisted of difficulty remembering motor movements associated with the letters he was supposed to write. He was able to copy the letters, and also form images that were similar to the letters. This suggests that dysgraphia for letters is a deficit related to motor memory. Somehow there is a distinct process within the brain related to writing letters, which is dissociated from copying and drawing letter-like items.

== See also ==
- Automaticity – Ability to do things without occupying the mind with the low-level details required
- Aphantasia – Inability to picture something in one's mind
- Motor learning – Movements that reflect nervous system changes
- Motor coordination – Directed movement of body parts to accomplish an action
- Muscle – Biological tissue that allows movement
- Memory consolidation – Category of memory stabilizing processes
- Overlearning – Practicing newly acquired skills beyond the point of initial mastery
- Procedural memory – Unconscious memory used to perform tasks
- Yips – Condition of sudden skill or control loss in an athlete
- Mentalism – Performing art showcasing mental abilities
