= Ultimate Typing Championship =

Competition involving typing

The Ultimate Typing Championship (UTC) is a typing competition designed to identify and award the fastest typists in the US.

== History ==
The Ultimate Typing Championship was created in order to promote typing and find the fastest typists in the United States of America. Players compete against each other in typing races. Typing races are done in real time online via an online typing race application. Finalists compete in person at SXSW in Austin, Texas. The Ultimate Typing Championship was initially created by the keyboard manufacturer Das Keyboard.

Sean Wrona of Ithaca, NY and Nate Bowen of New York, NY were the two finalists in the inaugural Ultimate Typing Championship, held on March 14 at the 2010 SXSW Interactive Festival. Wrona and Bowen competed in a best-of-three finals. The first round consisted of a standard 574-word text in which Wrona defeated Bowen 163-110 wpm, setting an unofficial world record. The second round consisted of a more difficult text involving the majority of the keys on the QWERTY keyboard, in which Wrona defeated Bowen 124-79 wpm to win the Ultimate Typing Championship and a $2,000 first prize. Since then, the finals have gathered over 10 million views on YouTube.

In the 2020 edition, the final was also best of 3. The former winner of the competition in the 2010 edition, Sean Wrona and Chak, one of the fastest typists of today, went to the final. In the first race Chak defeats Sean Wrona by 182.6-175.2 wpm, in the second race Chak defeats Sean by 210.4-183.8 wpm, and the last and third race Chak defeats Sean by 180.7-172.3 wpm, becoming the champion of the 2020 edition of the competition.

== See also ==
- Speed typing contest
