= Touch typing =

Typing without the use of sight to find the keys

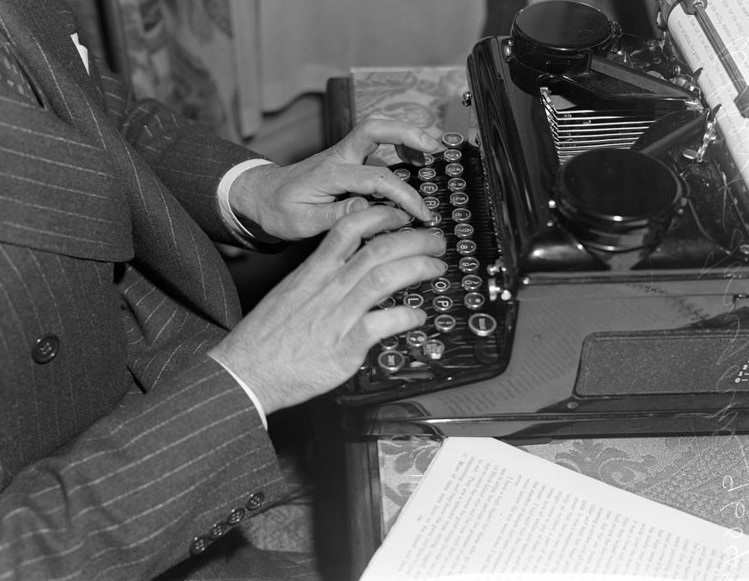
Competitive typist Albert Tangora demonstrating his typing in 1938

Touch typing (also called blind typing, or touch keyboarding) is a style of typing. Although the phrase refers to typing without using the sense of sight to find the keys—specifically, a touch typist will know their location on the keyboard through muscle memory—the term is often used to refer to a specific form of touch typing that involves placing the eight fingers in a horizontal row along the middle of the keyboard (the home row) and having them reach for specific other keys. (Under this usage, typists who do not look at the keyboard but do not use home row either are referred to as hybrid typists.) Both two-handed touch typing and one-handed touch typing are possible.

Frank E. McGurrin, a court stenographer from Salt Lake City, Utah, United States, who taught typing classes, reportedly invented home row touch typing in 1888. On a standard QWERTY keyboard for English speakers the home row keys are: "ASDF" for the left hand and "JKL;" for the right hand. Most modern computer keyboards have a raised dot or bar on the home keys for the index fingers to help touch typists maintain and rediscover the correct positioning of the fingers on the keyboard keys.

== History ==
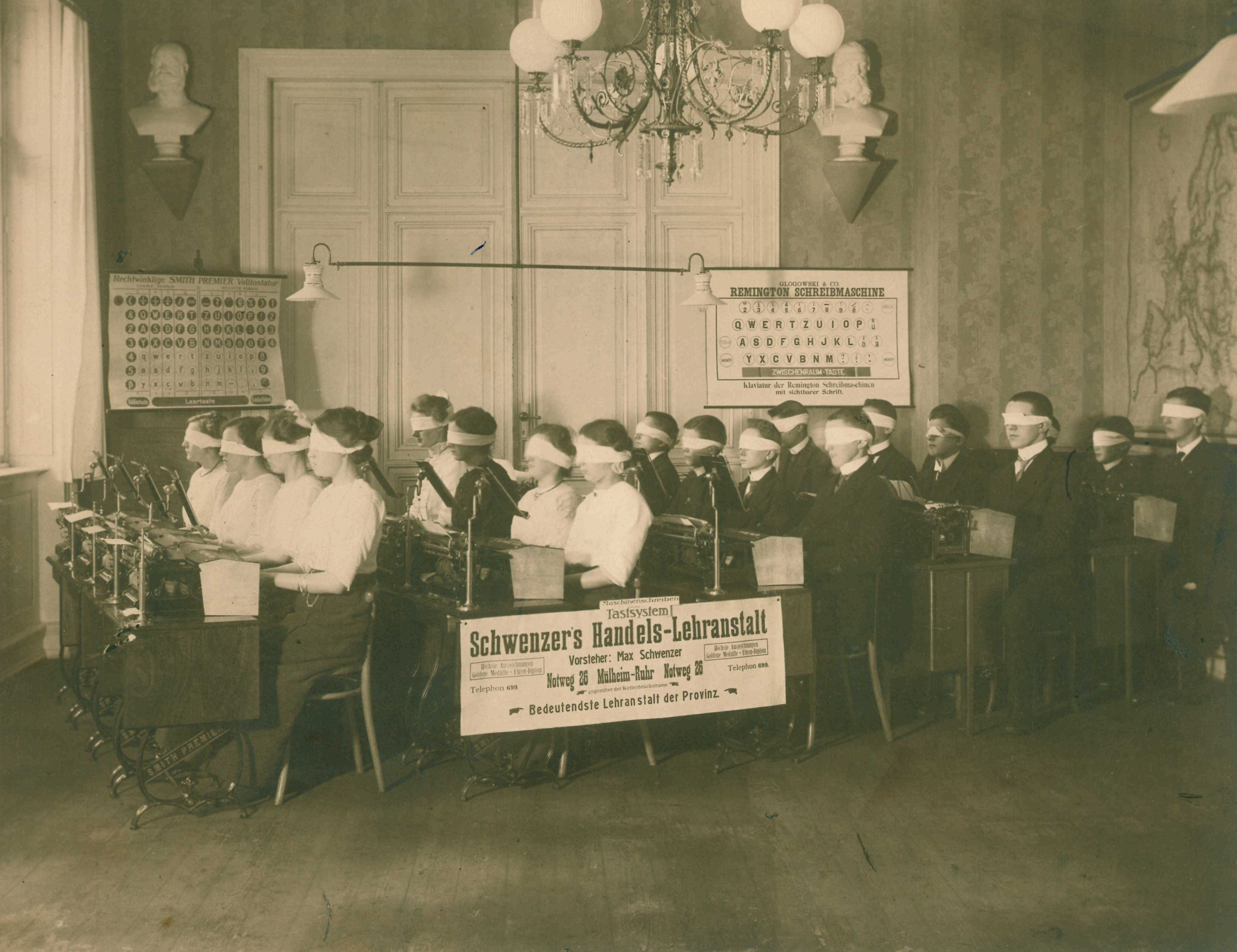
A 1910 promotional photograph touting touch typing instruction in a typing school. Mülheim, Germany

"Do you not find," he said, "that with your short sight it is a little tiring to do so much typewriting?"
"I did at first," she answered, "but now I know where the letters are without looking."

— Arthur Conan Doyle, A Case of Identity (1891)

Original layouts for the first few mechanical typewriters were in alphabetical order (ABCDE etc.) Changes were made, mostly responding to suggestions from telegraphists who were among the first users. Common letters were moved towards the center and into the upper row. The view that the layout was intentionally redesigned to slow down the operator, to prevent jamming the mechanism, is widespread but not correct.

The calculations for keyboard layout were based on the language being typed and this meant different keyboard layouts would be needed for each language. In English-speaking countries, for example, the first row is QWERTY, but in French-speaking countries it is AZERTY. Though mechanical typewriters are now rarely used, moves to change the layout to increase speed have been largely ignored or resisted due to familiarity with the existing layout among touch typists.

On July 25, 1888, an American man, Frank Edward McGurrin, who was reportedly the only person using touch typing at the time, won a decisive victory over Louis Traub (operating Caligraph with eight-finger method) in a typing contest held in Cincinnati. The results were displayed on the front pages of many newspapers. McGurrin won US$500 (equivalent to $18,000 in 2025) and popularized the new typing method.

Whether McGurrin was actually the first person to touch type or simply the first to be popularly noticed, is disputed. Speeds attained by other typists in other typing competitions at the time suggest that they must have been using similar systems.

In 1889, Bates Torrey coined the words "writing by touch" in his article. In 1890, Lovisa Ellen Bullard Barnes defined the words "write by touch" in her book as follows:

To learn to write by touch, that is, with only an occasional glance at the key-board, sit directly in front of the machine. Keep the hands as nearly as possible in one position over the key-board.

In 1985, Touch Typist Typing Tutor, developed and released by Sector Software is an early example of typing tutor software.

Touch typing is contrasted to search and peck, also known as hunt-and-peck or two-fingered typing. Instead of relying on the memorized position of keys, the typist finds each key by sight and moves their finger over to press it, usually the index finger of their dominant hand. This method is considered inferior as not only is it slower than touch typing, the typist would have to have their fingers travel a greater distance.

Various other styles in between those two exist—for example, using a search-and-peck method, but with an increased number of fingers; typing without looking at the keyboard, but using fewer than the eight fingers that the home row method uses (commonly, the omission of the little finger as the weakest finger that many will find difficult to hit keys with due to either less strength, less dexterity, or both); moving their entire hand to reach for the desired key; or only moving when a key needs to be pressed instead of always returning to home row after every keystroke.

Start position with fingers on the home row

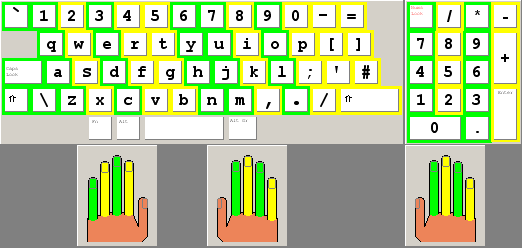
Standard finger placement on a QWERTY keyboard

== Advantages ==
=== Speed ===
Touch type training can improve an individual's typing speed and accuracy dramatically. Speeds average around 30–40 WPM (words per minute), while a speed of 60–80 WPM is the approximate speed to keep up with one's thoughts. A Microsoft survey suggested that many managers expect employees to be able to type at a minimum of 50 WPM. Professional career typists can exceed 100 WPM repeatedly and continuously (secretarial, data entry, etc.). Routine practice is required to maintain a high typing speed and accuracy.

=== Reduced switching of attention ===
A touch typist does not need to move the sight between the keyboard (that may be obscured with hands) and other areas that require attention. This usually increases productivity, speed, and accuracy of typists.

=== Reduced neck strain ===
Touch typing helps improve posture and reduce neck pain by keeping one's eyes focused on the display and avoiding the constant need to glance at the keyboard.

=== Disputes over advantages ===
There are many other typing styles in between novice-style "hunt and peck" and touch typing. For example, many hunt-and-peck typists have the keyboard layout memorized and are able to type while focusing their gaze on the screen. One study examining 30 subjects, of varying different styles and expertise, has found minimal difference in typing speed between touch typists and self-taught hybrid typists. According to the study, "The number of fingers does not determine typing speed... People using self-taught typing strategies were found to be as fast as trained typists... instead of the number of fingers, there are other factors that predict typing speed... fast typists... keep their hands fixed on one position, instead of moving them over the keyboard, and more consistently use the same finger to type a certain letter." To quote doctoral candidate Anna Feit: "We were surprised to observe that people who took a typing course performed at similar average speed and accuracy as those that taught typing to themselves and only used 6 fingers on average". However, the study has been criticised for only selecting subjects with average typing speeds up to 75 words per minute, thus lacking generalizability for faster typists.

== Training for beginners ==
A touch typist starts by placing their fingers in the middle row, they instinctively know which finger they have to move for reaching any required key. Learning for beginners typically includes practicing through various touch-typing websites or software. These websites and software typically start with training and making the user familiar with the home row, and then start with training the user to type on the other two rows. It is important to learn to place fingers on the home-row by feeling the tactile markers on the keyboard as the hands are frequently raised from the keyboard to operate the line feed lever (in the past) or (more recently) the computer mouse. The keys "F" and "J" contains tactile markers or key locator bumps that allow the typist to feel and recognize them without having to look on the keyboard.

Typing speed increases gradually with practice, and speed of 60 WPM or higher is achievable. The increase in speed varies between individuals. Many websites and software programs are available for learning touch typing and most of them are free. Learning touch typing can be stressful both to the fingers as well as the mind at the beginning, but once it is learned, it exerts minimal stress on the fingers. For individuals with past typing experience, learning to touch type could be particularly difficult, because of their habit of hunt-and-peck typing: the initial performance level in touch typing is far lower than in hunt-and-peck typing; therefore it does not initially seem worthwhile for beginners to start studying touch typing.

Typing speed generally improves with practice. While practicing, it is important to ensure that there are no weak keys. Typing speed is typically determined by how slow these weak keys are typed rather than how fast the remaining keys are typed. it's common for speed to plummet at the beginning, but with consistent practice it does not last for more than few months.

=== Home row ===
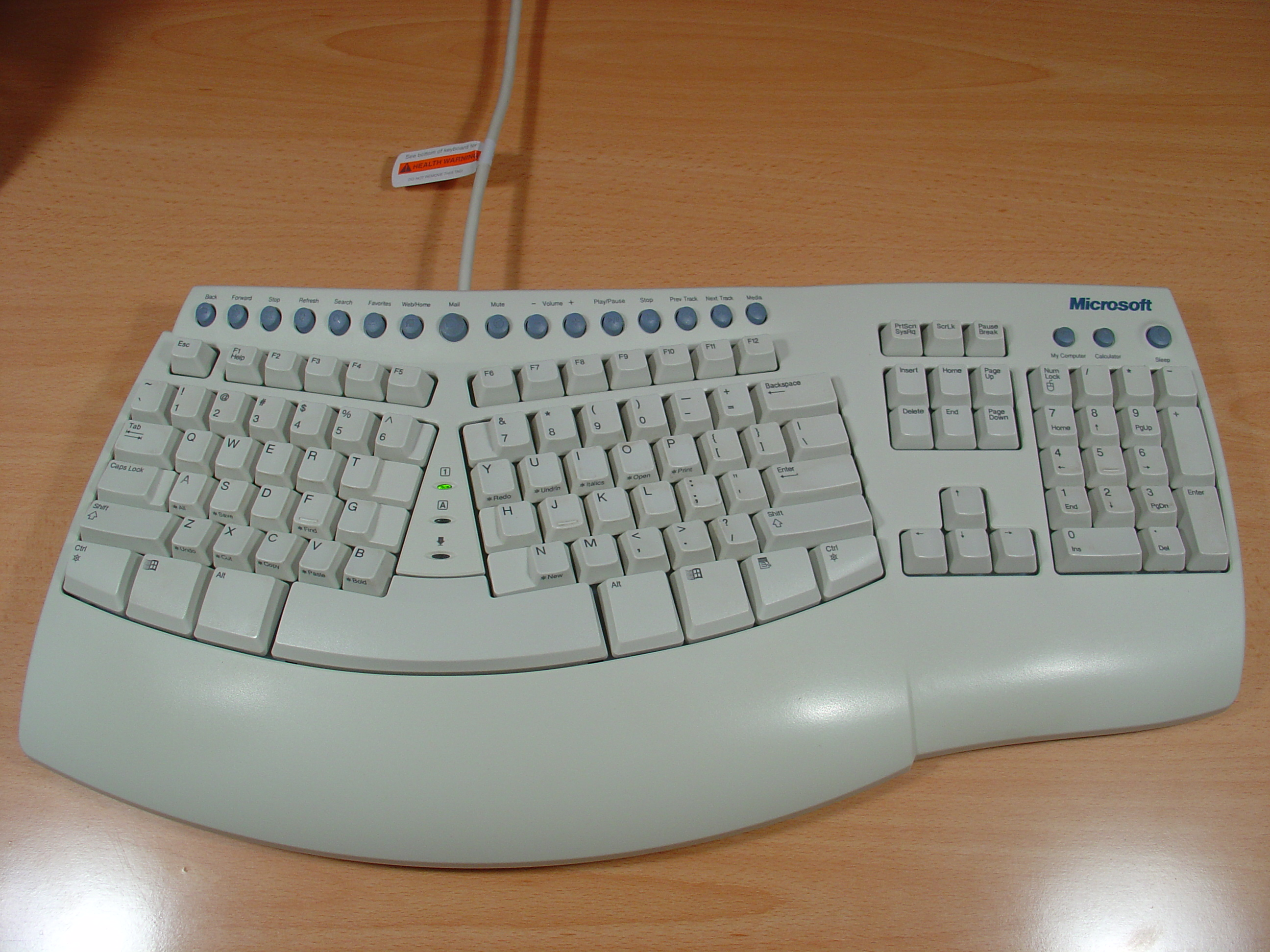
Microsoft Natural Keyboard Pro, c. 1999

The "home row" is the center row of keys on a typewriter or computer keyboard. On the most common type of English language keyboard, the QWERTY layout, "A S D F" and "J K L ;" are the home keys on the home row.

The middle row of the keyboard is termed "home row" because typists are trained to keep their fingers on these keys and return to them after pressing any other key that is not on the home row. The home row is also called the middle row because it is located in the middle between the top row (Note: The top row is slightly counterintuitively named, in that it is only on top relative to the middle and bottom rows of the letter keys layout; however it sits below the numbers row, which on modern computer keyboards most often is itself located below a function keys row.)—further back from the typist—and bottom row (Note: Like the top row (q.v.), the bottom row is slightly counterintuitively named, in that the row actually closest to the typist is the one the space bar is on. This is technically below the so-called bottom row.) – closer to the typist.

Some keyboards have a small bump on certain keys of the home row. This helps returning the fingers to the home row for touch typing.

For instance, to type the word poll on a QWERTY keyboard, one would place all of one's fingers on the home row. (The right hand should be covering "J K L ;" with the right thumb on the space bar while the left hand covers "A S D F" with the left thumb on the space bar.) The typist will then use their little finger to reach for the "P" key located just above the semicolon and then return the little finger back to the semicolon key from which it originated. The ring finger, located on the "L" key will be moved directly upwards to press the "O" key and then back. Finally, the same ring finger will remain on the "L" key and press it twice. Experienced typists can do this at speeds of over 100 words per minute.

== Other methods ==
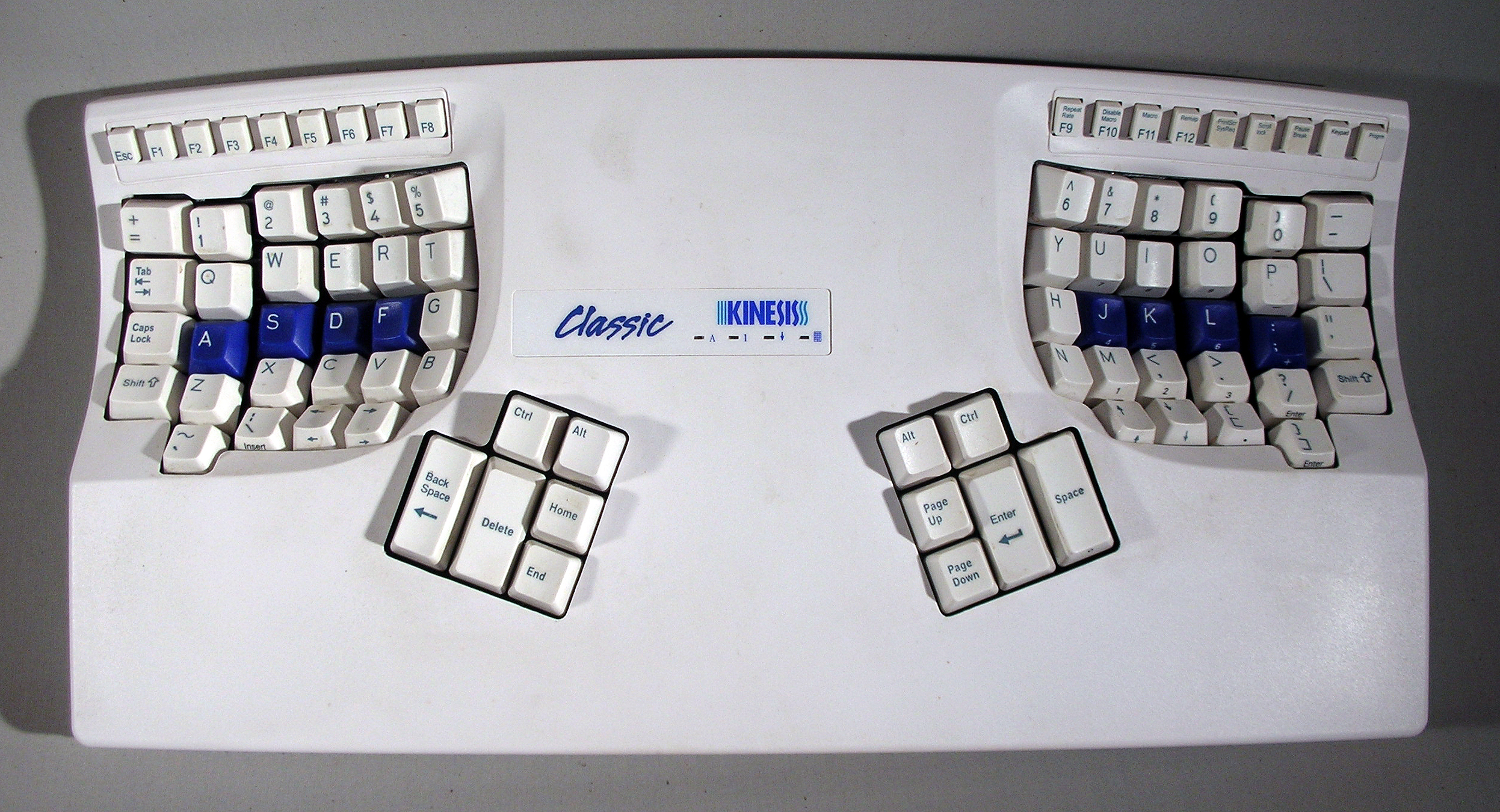
The Kinesis keyboard

A method taught since the 1960s (and perhaps earlier): The left little finger is used for the keys 1 2, the ring finger for 3, the middle — 4, the left index finger is responsible for 5 and 6. On the right side of the keyboard: index — 7 and 8, middle — 9, ring — 0 and the little — all other keys on the right side of the upper row. These two methods likely reflect the layout of the typewriters from early days when some of them had no 0 and/or 1 keys.

A third method is a mix of both methods: The left hand works exactly the same as above, and the right hand as in the base method (the right index finger is used for digit 7 only). Some people consider this more ergonomic since the fingers of both hands generally move to the inside.

There exist special ergonomic keyboards designed for each typing method. The keyboard is split between the keys 5 and 6 or 6 and 7.

Some specialized high-end computer keyboards are designed for touch typists. For example, many manufacturers provide blank mechanical keyboards. A trained touch typist should not mind using a blank keyboard. This kind of keyboard may force hunt and peck users to type without looking, similar to Braille keyboards used by the visually impaired.

== See also ==
- Dvorak keyboard layout, an alternative English keyboard layout, advertised as optimised for comfort and speed
- Category:Typing software, software that is designed for teaching users to touch type
