= Unicode input =

Input characters using their Unicode code points

The Unicode logo

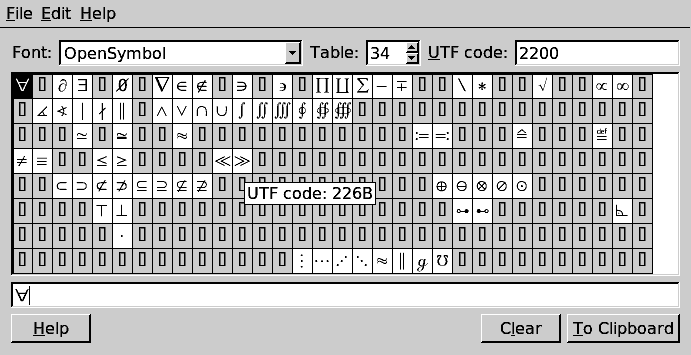
The KCharSelect character mapping tool, shown displaying a subset of the Unicode Mathematical Operators

Unicode input is a data entry method for specific characters that are not directly available on a physical keyboard. (Unicode is the character encoding system used by virtually all modern computers and smartphones.) Characters can be entered either by selecting them from a display, by typing a certain sequence or a 'chord' of keys on a physical keyboard, or by drawing the symbol by hand on touch-sensitive screen. In contrast to the historic 96 element character set encoded by ASCII (which it contains), Unicode encodes hundreds of thousands of graphemes (characters) from almost all of the world's written languages as well as many other signs and symbols.

A comprehensive Unicode input system must provide for a large repertoire of characters, ideally all valid Unicode code points. This is different from a keyboard layout which defines keys and their combinations only for a limited number of characters appropriate for a certain locale. Nevertheless, the latter technique (particularly if an "extended" setting is used) is often adequate to satisfy the needs of most users, most of the time.

== Unicode numbers ==
Characters encoded in Unicode are identified by code points, which are conventionally represented by "U+" followed by four, five or six hexadecimal digits. For example, U+00AE and U+1D310 are the code points for "®" and "𝌐" respectively. Characters in the Basic Multilingual Plane (BMP), containing modern scripts – including many Chinese and Japanese characters – and many symbols, have a 4-digit code. Historic scripts, but also many modern symbols and pictographs (such as emoticons, emojis, playing cards and many CJK characters) have 5-digit codes.

== Character availability ==
An application can display a character only if it can access a computer font which includes that character. Fonts usually have incomplete Unicode coverage; most only contain the graphemes needed to support a few writing systems. However, most modern browsers and other text-processing applications are able to display multilingual content because they perform font substitution, automatically switching to a fallback font when necessary to display characters which are not provided in the current font. Which fonts are used for fallback and the thoroughness of Unicode coverage varies by software and operating system; some software will search all of the installed fonts for an alternative glyph for that character (grapheme); others only search within certain fonts.

=== .notdef ===
If an application does not have access to a glyph for a required codepoint in the specified font (or in the system fallback font), the character is shown as the .notdef glyph. This often appears as an empty box, ☐ (nicknamed tofu – see Noto fonts § Etymology – based on the shape), a box with an X in it, ☒, a diamond with a question mark, �, or a box with a question mark in it, ⍰.

== Techniques ==
=== Extended keyboard mapping ===
Most operating systems support an 'extended keyboard mapping' system setting, which is a facility to increase the repertoire of characters – typically a precomposed character, a typographic symbol or punctuation mark, or other specialist graphemes – beyond those enabled by the keyboard and keyboard mapping provided by default with the computer. The most well-known techniques include

- Alternate graphic (AltGr or right-Alt key) that gives a third and fourth meaning to every key;
- Compose key (sometimes called multi key), a key on a computer keyboard that indicates that the following (usually 2 or more) keystrokes trigger the insertion of an alternate character;
- A dead key, a normal key that is repurposed to affect the behaviour of the next key pressed. It is typically used to attach a specific diacritic to a base letter;

or indeed combinations of these. The precise methods depend on which type of type of physical keyboard and (especially) the mapping used with it.

=== Selection from a screen ===
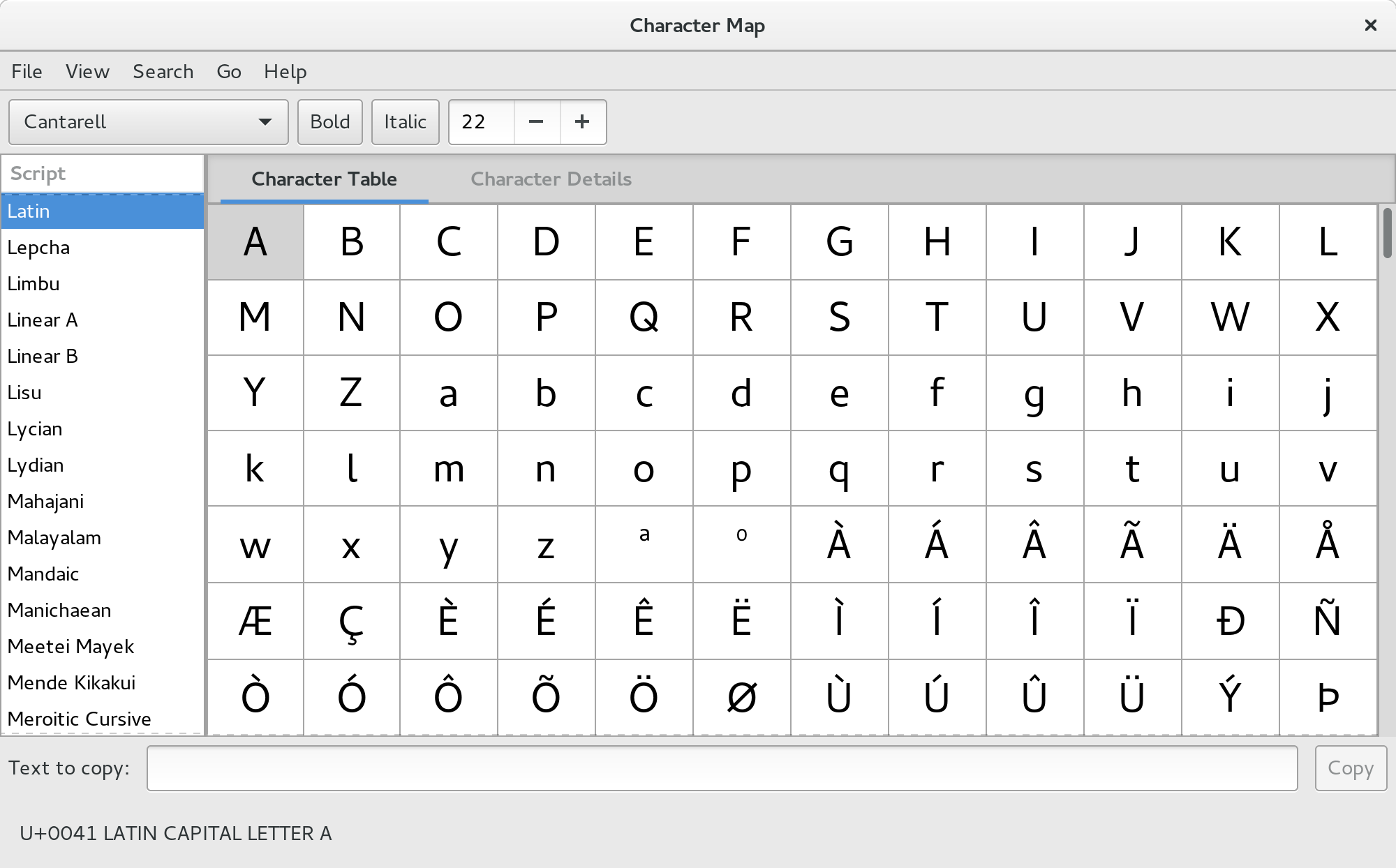
GNOME Character Map

Many systems provide a way to select Unicode characters visually. ISO/IEC 14755 refers to this as a screen-selection entry method.

Microsoft Windows has provided a Unicode version of the Character Map program, appearing in the consumer edition since XP. This is limited to characters in the Basic Multilingual Plane (BMP). Characters are searchable by Unicode character name, and the table can be limited to a particular code block. Starting with Windows 10 Microsoft Windows also contains so called "emoji keyboard". It can be started by holding down the Windows key and hitting the period or semicolon key. The emoji keyboard allows entering of emojis as well as symbols.

More advanced third-party tools of the same type are also available (a notable freeware example is BabelMap, which supports all Unicode characters). On most Linux desktop environments, equivalent tools – such as gucharmap (GNOME) or kcharselect (KDE) – are available.

Generally these tools let the user "copy" the selected characters into the clipboard, and then paste them into the document, rather than pretending to directly type them.

It is often practical to just find the desired character on the web or in another document, and copy and paste it from there.

=== Decimal input (Alt codes) ===
Some programs running in Microsoft Windows, including recent versions of Word and Notepad, can produce characters from their Unicode code points expressed in decimal and entered on the numeric keypad with the Alt key held down. For example, the Euro sign € has 20AC as its hexadecimal code point, which is 8364 in decimal, so Alt+8364 will produce the symbol.

Decimal code points in the range 160 –255 must be entered with a leading zero (so that the Windows code page is chosen) and furthermore the Windows code page CP1252 must be used. (Note: CP1252 is the default in North and South America, the Caribbean islands, Western Europe, Central and Southern Africa, Australia, New Zealand, the (former) European colonies, and possessions in Oceania.) For example, Alt+0247 yields a ÷, corresponding to its code point, but the character produced by Alt+247 depends on the OEM code page, such as Code page 437, and may yield a ≈. Also Alt+0128 through Alt+0159 yield the characters assigned in rows 8 and 9 in the CP1252 layout, rather than the C1 control codes that are assigned to those numbers in Unicode.

In programs which were not designed to handle Alt codes over 255, the character retrieved usually corresponds to the remainder when the number is divided by 256.

The text editor Vim allows characters to be specified by two-character mnemonics referred to as digraphs. The installed set can be augmented by custom mnemonics defined for arbitrary code points, specified in decimal. For example, as decimal 9881 is equal to hexadecimal 2699, dig Gr 9881 associates "Gr" with U+2699 ⚙ GEAR.

See below for use of decimal code points in HTML.

=== Hexadecimal input ===
Clause 5.1 of ISO/IEC 14755 describes a Basic method whereby a beginning sequence is followed by the hex number representation of the code point and the ending sequence. Most modern systems have some method to emulate this, sometimes limited to four digits (thus only the Basic Multilingual Plane).

==== In Microsoft Windows ====
Hexadecimal Unicode input can be enabled by adding a string type (REG_SZ) value called EnableHexNumpad to the registry key HKEY_CURRENT_USER\Control Panel\Input Method and assigning the value data 1 to it. Users will need to log off and back in after editing the registry for this input method to start working (in versions earlier than Windows Vista, users needed to reboot for it to start working). Unicode characters can then be entered by holding down Alt and, with Num Lock engaged, typing + on the numeric keypad, followed by the hexadecimal code, and then releasing Alt. This may not work for 5-digit hexadecimal codes like U+1F937.

In some applications such as Notepad, Office, and WordPad and some programs such as LibreOffice, Alt+X will replace the hexadecimal number to the left of the cursor with the matching Unicode character. Unless it is six hexadecimal digits long, the code must not be preceded by any digit or letters a–f as they may be treated as part of the code to be converted. For example, entering af1 followed by Alt+X (or Alt+C if using a French version) will produce U+0AF1 ૱ GUJARATI RUPEE SIGN, but entering a0000f1 followed by Alt+X will produce 'añ' (U+0061 a LATIN SMALL LETTER A followed by U+00F1 ñ LATIN SMALL LETTER N WITH TILDE).

This facility enables Unicode characters to be entered in other applications: one can create a desired character in Notepad, for example, and then cut and paste it wherever desired.

==== In MacOS ====
Hex input of Unicode must be enabled. In Mac OS 8.5 and later, one can choose the Unicode Hex Input keyboard layout; in OS X (10.10) Yosemite, this can be added in Keyboard → Input Sources.

Holding down ⌥ Option, one types the four-digit hexadecimal Unicode code point and the equivalent character appears; one can then release the ⌥ Option key. Characters outside of the BMP (the Basic Multilingual Plane) exceed the four-digit limit of the Unicode hex input mechanism but can be entered by using surrogate pairs: holding down the ⌥ Option key while entering the first surrogate, the +, the second surrogate, then releasing the Option key.

==== In X11 and Wayland (Linux and other Unix variants including ChromeOS) ====
In many applications one or both of the following methods work to directly input Unicode characters:

- Holding Ctrl+⇧ Shift and typing u followed by the hex digits, then releasing Ctrl+⇧ Shift.
- Entering Ctrl+⇧ Shift+u, releasing, then typing the hex digits and pressing ↵ Enter (or Space or even, on some systems, pressing and releasing ⇧ Shift or Ctrl).

This is supported by GTK and Qt applications, and possibly others. In ChromeOS, this is an operating system function.

=== In platform-independent applications ===
- In Emacs, Ctrl+x8Return invokes the insert-char command, which accepts input either via hex code point or unicode char name.
- In LibreOffice 5.1 onwards, the Alt+X method described above for Windows works.
- In Opera versions that use the Presto layout engine—i.e. up to and including version 12.xx—, entering the hexadecimal number of the desired symbol or character and then pressing Ctrl+⇧ Shift+x (alternative shortcut Meta+⇧ Shift++x on macOS).
- In the Vim editor, in insert mode, the user first types Ctrl+V u (for codepoints up to 4 hex digits long; using Ctrl+V ⇧ Shift+U for longer), then types in the hexadecimal number of the symbol or character desired, and it will be converted into the symbol. (On Microsoft Windows, Ctrl+Q may be required instead of Ctrl+V.)
- In AutoCAD \U+2C72 or three shortcuts %%c, %%d, %%p.

=== HTML ===
In HTML and XML, character codes to be rendered as characters are prefixed by ampersand and number sign (&#), and are followed by a semicolon (;). The code point can be either in decimal or in hexadecimal; in the latter case it is preceded by an "x". Leading zeros may be omitted. A number of characters may be represented by a named entity.

Example: In HTML/XML, U+00A9 © COPYRIGHT SIGN may be coded as:

- &#169; (decimal code point)
- &#xa9; (hexadecimal code point)
- &copy; (entity name)

This works in many pieces of software that accept HTML markup, such as Thunderbird and Wikipedia editing.

== See also ==
Various glyphs representing the letter ⟨a⟩ in various typefaces and as single- and double-storey; they are allographs of the same grapheme

- ASCII – Character encoding standard
- Digraphs and trigraphs (programming) – Two or three characters, treated as one
- Glyph – Purposeful written mark
- Typeface – Set of characters that share common design features
