= Backtick =

Typographical mark (`) (Freestanding grave accent)

`o

Backtick
- In Unicode: U+0060 ` GRAVE ACCENT (symbol)

Related
- See also: U+0300 ◌̀ COMBINING GRAVE ACCENT (diacritic)

The backtick ` is a typographical mark used mainly in computing. It is also known as backquote, grave, or grave accent.

The character was designed for typewriters to add a grave accent to a (lower-case (Note: Upper case letters would require the character to be printed higher on the page)) base letter, by overtyping it atop that letter. On early computer systems, however, this physical dead key+overtype function was rarely supported, being functionally replaced by precomposed characters. (Note: In ISO/IEC 8859-1 ("ISO Latin 1") and subsequently in Unicode.) Consequently, this ASCII symbol was rarely (if ever) used in computer systems for its original aim and became repurposed in computer programming for many unrelated uses.

The sign is located on the left-top of a US or UK layout keyboard, next to the 1 key. Provision (if any) of the backtick on other keyboards varies by national keyboard layout and keyboard mapping. In layouts that use the dead key concept, the backtick key is most frequently chosen for that purpose.

== History ==
=== Typewriters ===
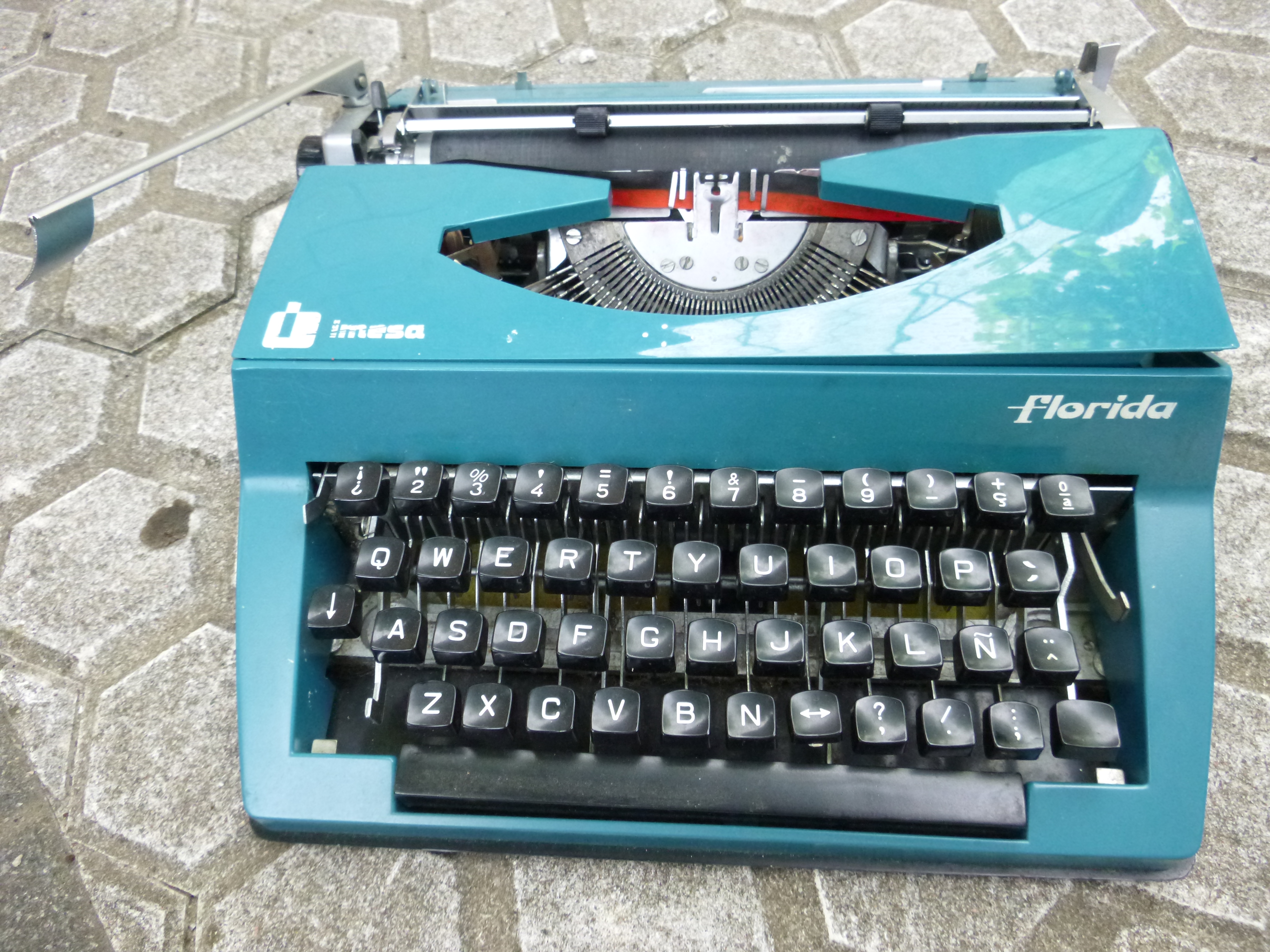
Spanish typewriter (QWERTY keyboard) with dead keys for acute, circumflex, diaeresis and grave accents.

On typewriters designed for languages that routinely use diacritics (accent marks), there are two possible solutions. Keys can be dedicated to pre-composed characters or alternatively a dead key mechanism can be provided. With the latter, a mark is made when a dead key is typed but, unlike normal keys, the paper carriage does not move on and thus, the next letter to be typed is printed under the accent.

=== Incorporation into ISO 646 and ASCII ===
The incorporation of the grave symbol into ASCII is a consequence of this prior existence on typewriters. This symbol did not exist independently as a type or hot-lead printing character.

It appears to have been at their May 13–15, 1963 meeting that the CCITT decided that the proposed ISO 7-bit code standard would be suitable for their needs if a lower case alphabet and five diacritical marks, including the grave accent, were added to it. At the October 29–31 meeting, then, the ISO subcommittee altered the ISO draft to meet the CCITT requirements, replacing the up-arrow and left-arrow with diacriticals, adding diacritical meanings to the apostrophe and quotation mark, and making the number sign a dual for the tilde.

— Yucca's free information site

Thus, ISO 646 was born and the ASCII standard updated to include the backtick and other symbols. (Note: ISO 646 (and ASCII, which it includes) is a standard for 7-bit encoding, providing just 96 printable characters (and 32 control characters). This was insufficient to meet the needs of Western European languages and so the standard specifies certain code points that are available for national variation. The code point allocated to backtick is 0x60 (decimal 96) is one such. Consequently, code-point 0x60 was often reallocated in local character sets to a more useful character. For example, in the French ISO 646 standard, the character at this position is μ. Many older UK computers (such as the ZX Spectrum and BBC Micro) have the pound sign (£) symbol at character 0x60, although BS 4730 (the British ISO 646 variant) placed '£' at position 0x23 instead. With the arrival of 8-bit "extended ASCII", this issue was largely mitigated, though not fully resolved until Unicode was established.)

=== As surrogate of apostrophe or (opening) single quote ===
Some early ASCII peripherals designed the backtick and apostrophe to be mirror images of each other: ‛ and ’. This allowed them to be used as matching pairs of open and close quotes while still being somewhat usable as grave and acute accents, made apostrophes typographically correct, and allowed the apostrophe to be used as a prime. This had a number of problems that led most modern systems and Unicode to render the apostrophe as a "straight" one:

- Open quote is not typographically correct: the correct form (‘) is flipped vertically from what is shown here.
- No matching double quotes, although two single quotes looked acceptable on proportionally-spaced devices.
- Wrong appearance if used as overprinted diacritics.
- Lots of software and documents used the apostrophe for opening as well as for closing quotes.

This can still be seen in documents and email from that time (before 1990), and in output generated by some UNIX console programs such as man pages. Institutions that traditionally had used it have abandoned or deprecated it.

== Computing ==
=== 'Dead key' operation ===
On computer keyboards with a suitable keyboard layout ('keyboard mapping'), the ` acts as a dead key. When pressed, it has no immediate effect – its effect is to apply a diacritic to the next key pressed.

- In the UK extended and the US-International layouts, the sequence `+letter adds a grave accent (e.g., `+a produces à).
- In the New Zealand "NZ Aotearoa" layout, the sequence `+letter adds a macron (e.g., `+a produces ā).

=== Command-line interface languages ===
Many command-line interface languages and the scripting (programming) languages like Perl, PHP, Ruby and Julia (though see below) use pairs of backticks to indicate command substitution. A command substitution is the standard output from one command, into an embedded line of text within another command. For example, using $ as the symbol representing a terminal prompt, the code line:

$ echo "It is now `date`"
It is now Tue Nov 17 18:13:01 UTC 2026

In all POSIX shells (including Bash and Zsh), the use of backticks for command substitution is now largely deprecated in favor of the notation $(...), so that the example above would be re-written:

$ echo "It is now $(date)"

The new syntax allows nesting, for example:

$ echo "An absolute path to the 'zcat' command is $( readlink -e "$( type -P zcat )" )"
An absolute path to the 'zcat' command is /usr/bin/gzip

=== Markup languages ===
It is sometimes used in source code comments to indicate code, e.g.,

/* Use the `printf()` function. */

This is also the format the Markdown formatter uses to indicate code. Some variations of Markdown support "fenced code blocks" that span multiple lines of code, starting (and ending) with three backticks in a row (```).

- TeX: The backtick character represents curly opening quotes. For example, ` is rendered as single opening curly quote (‘) and `` is a double curly opening quote (“). It also supplies the numeric ASCII value of an ASCII character wherever a number is expected.

=== Programming languages ===
- BBC BASIC: The backtick character is valid at the beginning of or within a variable, structure, procedure or function name.
- D and Go: The backtick surrounds a raw string literal.
- F#: Surrounding an identifier with double backticks allows the use of identifiers that would not otherwise be allowed, such as keywords, or identifiers containing punctuation or spaces.
- Haskell: Surrounding a function name by backticks makes it an infix operator.
- JavaScript: The ECMAScript 6 standard introduced a "backtick" character which indicated a string or template literal. Its applications include: string interpolation (substitution), embedded expressions, and multi-line strings. In the following example name and pet variable's values get substituted into the string enclosed by grave accent characters:
  const name = "Mary", pet = "lamb"; // Set variables
let   temp = `${name} has a little ${pet}!`;
      console.log(temp);
      // => "Mary has a little lamb!";
- Julia: Backticks make a command object, Cmd, that can be run, with run function, like run(`echo Hello world!`). Julia variables can be interpolated, but only indirectly shell environment variables.
- Lisp macro systems: The backtick character (called quasiquote in Scheme and Racket) introduces a quoted expression in which comma-substitution may occur. It is identical to the plain quote, except that a nested expression prefixed with a comma is replaced with the value of that nested expression. If the nested expression is a symbol (that is, a variable name in Lisp), the symbol's value is used. If the expression is program code, the first value returned by that code is inserted instead of the comma-prefixed code. This is roughly analogous to the Bourne shell's variable interpolation with $ inside double quotes.
- m4: A backtick together with an apostrophe quotes strings (to suppress or defer macro expansion).
- MySQL/MariaDB: A backtick in queries is a delimiter for column, table, and database identifiers.
- OCaml: The backtick indicates polymorphic variants.
- Pico: The backtick indicates comments in the programming language.
- PowerShell: The backtick is used as the escape character. For example, a newline character is denoted `n. Most common programming languages use a backslash as the escape character (e.g., \n), but because Windows allows the backslash as a path separator, it is impractical for PowerShell to use backslash for a different purpose. Two backticks produce the ` character itself. For example, the nullable boolean of .NET is specified in PowerShell as [Nullable``1[System.Boolean]].
- Python: Prior to version 3.0, backticks were a synonym for the repr() function, which converts its argument to a string suitable for a programmer to view. However, this feature was removed in Python 3.0. Backticks also appear extensively in the reStructuredText plain text markup language (implemented in the Python docutils package).
- R: The backtick is used to surround non-syntactic variable names. This includes variable names containing special characters or reserved words, among others.
- Scala: An identifier may also be formed by an arbitrary string between backticks. The identifier then is composed of all characters excluding the backticks themselves.
- Tom: The backtick creates a new term or to calls an existing term.
- Unlambda: The backtick character denotes function application.
- Verilog HDL: The backtick is used at the beginning of compiler's directives.

== Games ==
In many PC-based computer games in the US and UK, the ` key is used to open the console so the user can execute script commands via its CLI. This is true for games such as Factorio, Battlefield 3, Half-Life, Halo CE, Quake, Half-Life 2, Blockland, Soldier of Fortune II: Double Helix, Unreal, Counter-Strike, Crysis, Morrowind, Oblivion, Skyrim, Fallout: New Vegas, Fallout 3, Fallout 4, RuneScape, and games based on the Quake engine or Source engine. While not necessarily the original progenitor of the console key concept, Quake is still widely associated with any usage of the ` key as a toggle for a drop-down console, often being referred to as the "Quake Key". In 2021, Windows Terminal introduced a "Quake Mode" which enables a global shortcut of ⊞ Win+` that opens a terminal window pinned to the top half of the screen.

== See also ==
- Other symbols were originally specified to be used as dead keys to add a diacritic (emulating the backspace and overtype technique used with typewriters). In modern use, they are standalone characters although their dead key operation to invoke a precomposed character usually remains possible when used in combination with the AltGr key and an appropriate keyboard layout.
  - Acute accent – Diacritical mark (◌́) (´, ◌́)
  - Caret – Typographical mark (^)
  - Tilde – Punctuation and accent mark (~, ◌̃)
