= German keyboard layout =

QWERTZ keyboard layout

The German keyboard layout is used in Austria and Germany for the German language, and is the most common of the QWERTZ layouts widely used in Central and Southeast Europe. The keyboard layout is based on one defined in a former edition (October 1988) of the German standard DIN 2137‑2. The current edition, DIN 2137-1:2012-06, standardizes it as the first (basic) of three layouts, calling it "T1" (Tastaturbelegung 1, "keyboard layout 1").

The German layout differs from the English (US and UK) layouts in four major ways:

- The positions of the Z and Y keys are switched.
- Part of the keyboard is adapted to include umlauted vowels ⟨ä, ö, ü⟩ and sharp s ⟨ß⟩. (Some newer implementations of the layout offer the assignment AltGr+H → ẞ for its capital version.)
- Some of special key inscriptions are changed to a graphical symbol (e.g. ⇪ Caps Lock is an upward arrow, ← Backspace a leftward arrow). Most of the other abbreviations are replaced by German abbreviations (thus e.g. ⌃ Ctrl is translated to its German equivalent Strg, for Steuerung). Esc remains as such. (See § Key labels.)
- Like many other non-American keyboards, German keyboards change the right Alt key into the AltGr key to access a third level of character assignments. This is necessary because the umlauts and other special characters leave no room to have all the special symbols of ASCII, needed by programmers among others, available on the first or second (shifted) levels without unduly increasing the size of the keyboard.

== General information ==
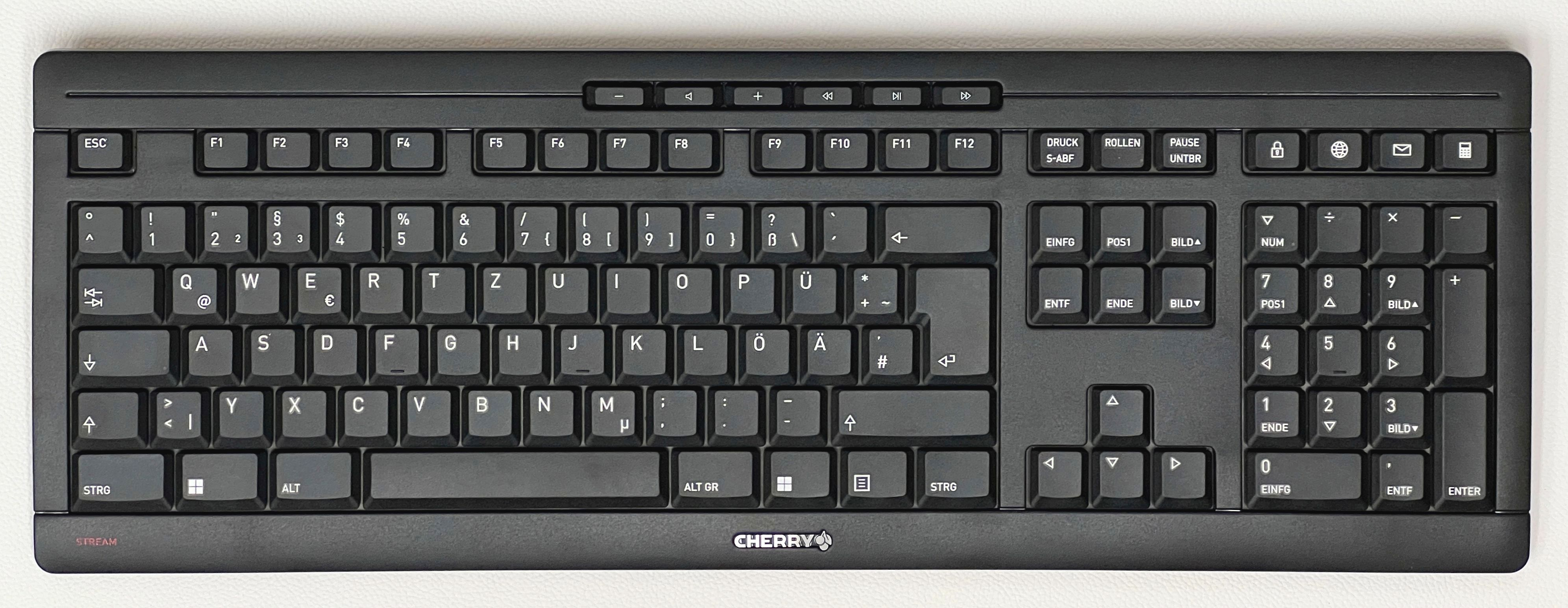
Computer keyboard with the basic German keyboard layout (named “T1” since DIN 2137-1:2012-06). The additional function keys (6 small ones in the top row; 4 above of the numeric keypad at the right) are not part of the standard layout.

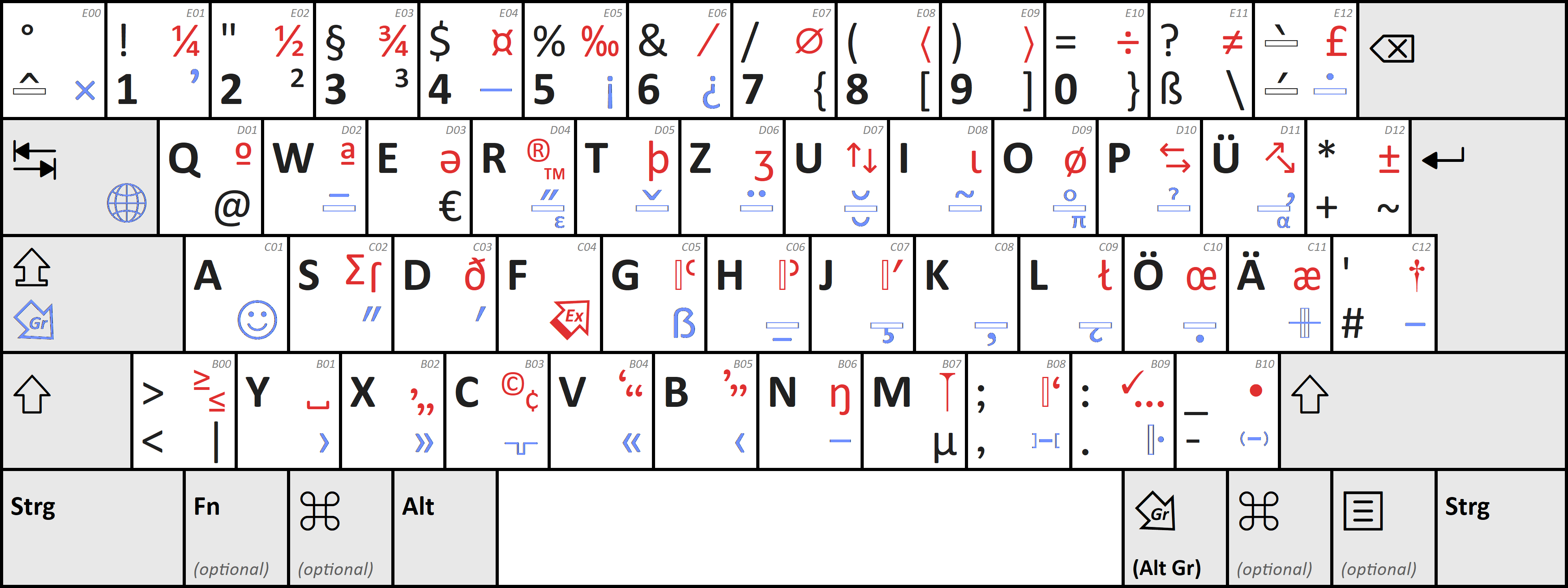
German extended keyboard layout E1 according to DIN 2137-01:2023-08. The characters shown in black represent the basic layout T1.

The characters ², ³, { , [ , ] , } , \ , @, |, µ, ~, and € are accessed by holding the Alt Gr key and tapping the other key. The Alt key on the left will not access these additional characters. Alternatively Strg+Alt and pressing the respective key also produce the alternative characters in many environments, in order to support keyboards that only have one left Alt key.

The accent keys ^, ´, ` are dead keys: press and release an accent key, then press a letter key to produce accented characters (ô, á, ù, etc.; the current DIN 2137-1:2012-06 extends this for e.g. ń, ś etc.). If the entered combination is not encoded in Unicode by a single code point (precomposed character), most current implementations cause the display of a free-standing (spacing) version of the accent followed by the unaccented base letter. For users with insufficient typing skills this behaviour (which is explicitly not compliant with the current DIN 2137-1:2012-06) leads to mistype a spacing accent instead of an apostrophe (e.g., it´s instead of correctly it's).

Note that the semicolon and colon are accessed by using the ⇧ Shift key.

The T1 layout lacks some important characters like the German-style quotation marks („“ and ‚‘). As a consequence, these are seldom used in internet communication and usually replaced by " and '.

Therefore, extended keyboard layouts were designed not only to overcome such restrictions, but firstly to enable typing of other languages written in the Latin script. The 2012 edition of the DIN keyboard standard defined a T2 layout as extension of the T1 layout and a T3 layout as further extension of the T2 layout. However, these got no widespread use. Therefore, they were dropped and replaced by the German extended keyboard layouts E1 and E2 in the 2018 revision of the standard. With the 2023 edition (which differ by key arrangement but not by range), these were slightly revised again based on the experience collected with the first implementations.

=== Key labels ===
Contrary to many other languages, German keyboards are usually not labeled in English (in fact, DIN 2137-1:2012-06 requires either the symbol according to ISO/IEC 9995-7 or the German abbreviation is to be used, with "Esc" and "AltGr" as exceptions). The abbreviations used on German keyboards are:

German label	English equivalent
Steuerung (Strg)	Ctrl (Control)
Einfügen (Einfg)	Insert (Ins)
Entfernen (Entf)	Delete (Del)
Bild auf/Bild nach oben (Bild↑)	Page Up (PgUp)
Bild ab/Bild nach unten (Bild↓)	Page Down (PgDn)
Position eins (Pos1)	Home ("position one")
Ende (Ende)	End (end)
Drucken / Systemabfrage (Druck/S-Abf)	Print Screen
Rollen	Scroll Lock ("to roll")
Pause/Unterbrechen (Pause/Untbr)	Pause/Break

On some keyboards – including the original IBM PC/AT (and later) German keyboards – the asterisk (*) key on the numeric keypad is instead labeled with the multiplication sign (×), and the divide-key is labeled with the division sign (÷) instead of slash (/). However, those keys still generate the asterisk and slash characters, not the multiplication and division signs.

=== Caps lock ===
The behaviour of ⇪ Caps Lock according to former editions of the DIN 2137 standard is inherited from mechanical typewriters: Pressing it once shifts all keys including numbers and special characters until the ⇪ Caps Lock key is pressed again. Holding ⇧ Shift while ⇪ Caps Lock is active unshifts all keys. The current DIN 2137-1:2012-06 simply requests the presence of a "capitals lock" key (which is the name used in the ISO/IEC 9995 series), without any description of its function.

In IT, an alternative behaviour is often preferred, usually described as "IBM", which is the same as ⇪ Caps Lock on English keyboards – only letters are shifted, and hitting ⇪ Caps Lock again releases it.

Both ⇧ Shift and ⇪ Caps Lock lack any textual labels, despite bearing names that are used in texts like manuals. The ⇪ Caps Lock key is called Feststellttaste (locking key) and simply labeled with a large down-arrow (on newer designs pointing to an uppercase A letter). ⇧ Shift is called Umschalttaste (switching key) and labeled with a large up-arrow.

== OS-specific layouts ==
=== Linux ===
German keyboard layout in modern Linux systems

Most Linux distributions include a keymap for German in Germany that extends the T1 layout with a set of characters and dead keys similar, but not identical to the "Outdated common secondary group" of ISO/IEC 9995-3:2002.

== History ==
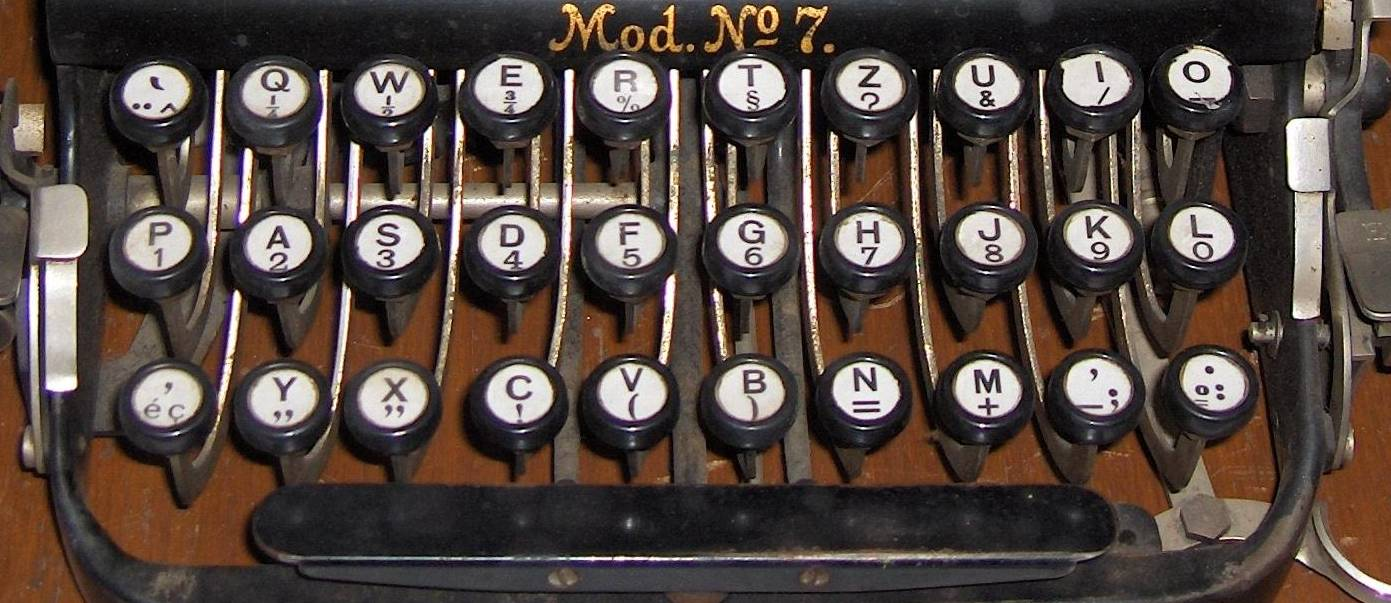
Keyboard of an Adler typewriter Model No. 7, produced about 1899–1920 in Frankfurt

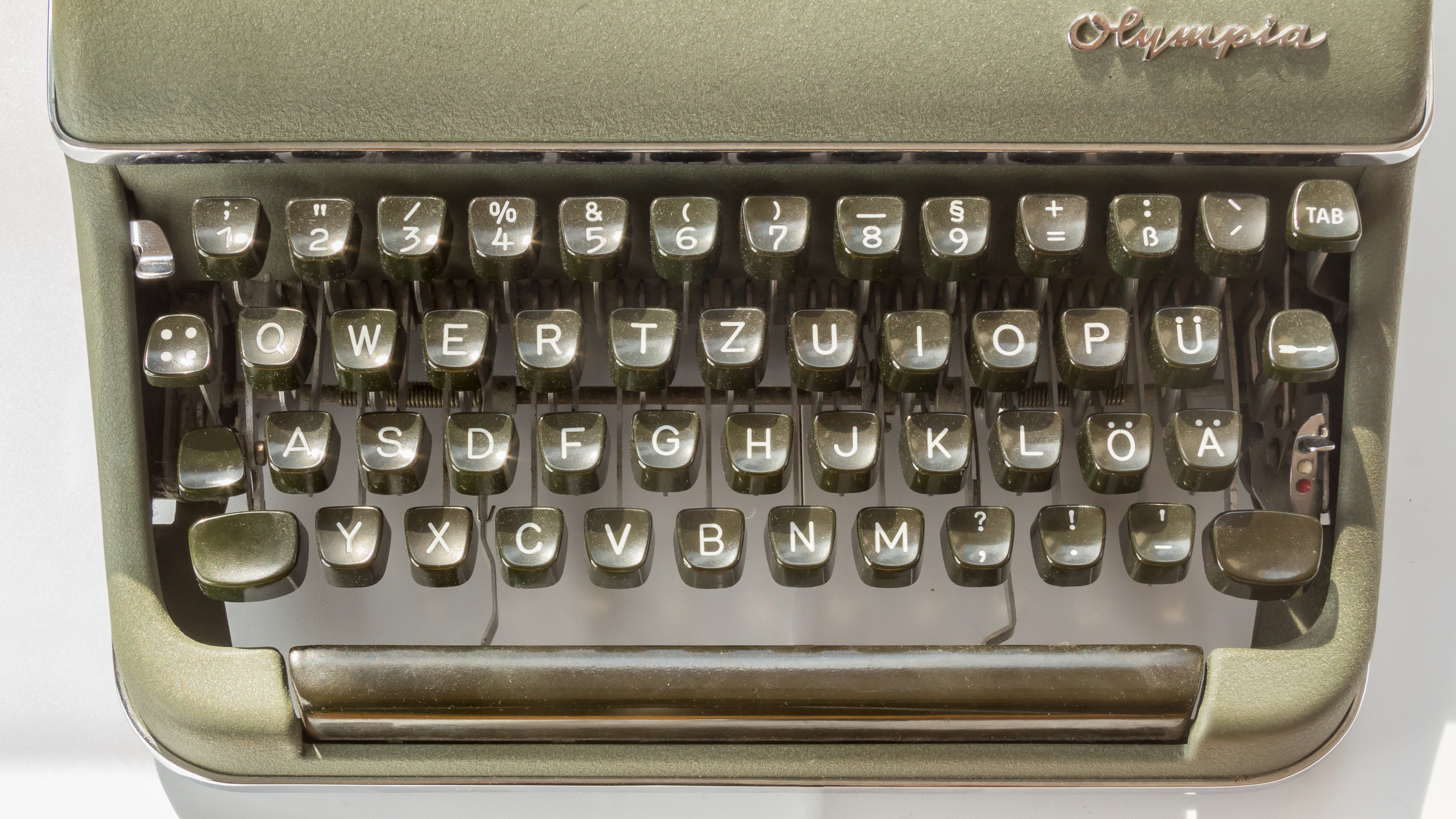
Keyboard of a mechanical typewriter Olympia SM3, produced 1954 by Olympia-Werke, Germany.

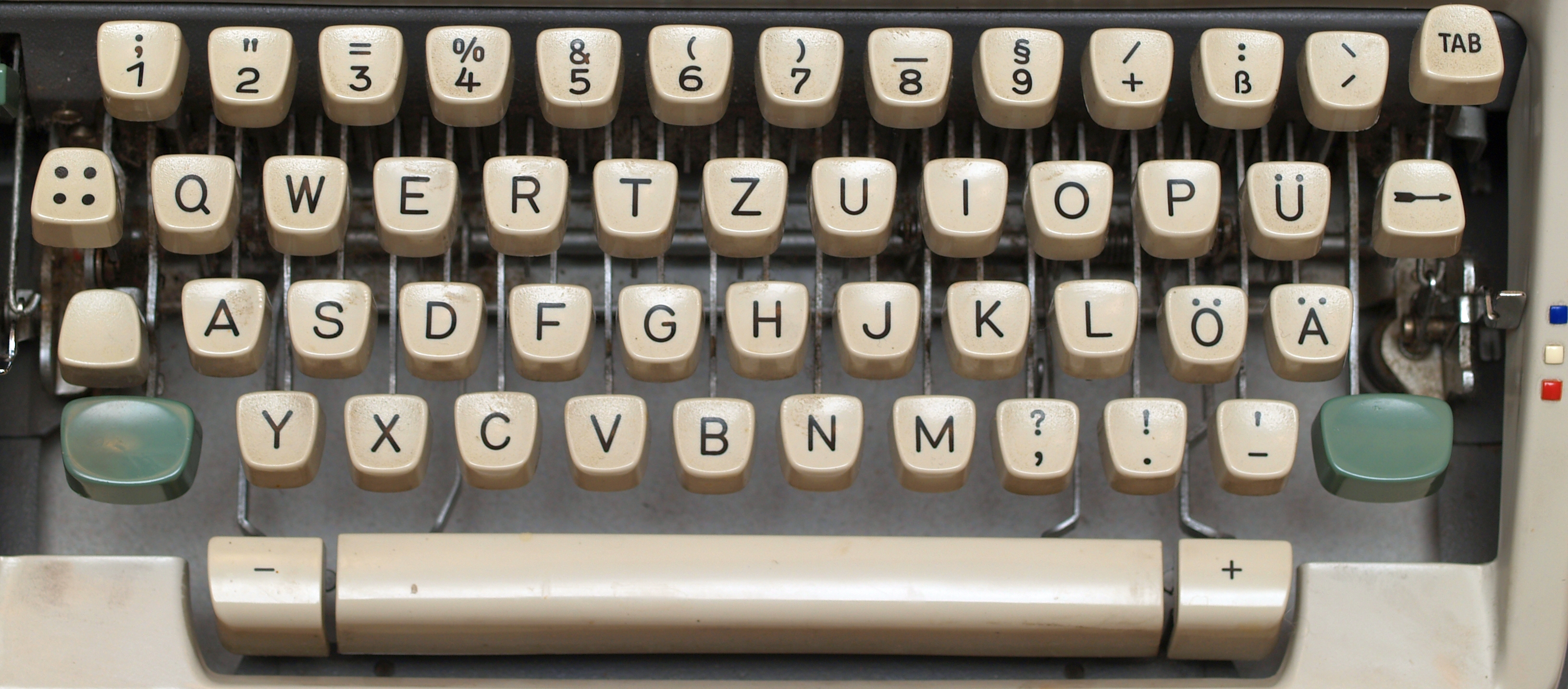
Keyboard of a mechanical typewriter Olympia SM9, produced 1964 by Olympia-Werke, Germany. This layout was defined by DIN 2112 (1956, with revisions 1967 and 1976). The location of the punctuation marks on the upper numerical row is different from modern computer keyboards. The key with ∷ four dots is the margin release. The arrow key under TAB is the ↣ Backspace key, which is pointing in the direction the paper would move rather than the way a cursor would move (as on a modern computer keyboard).

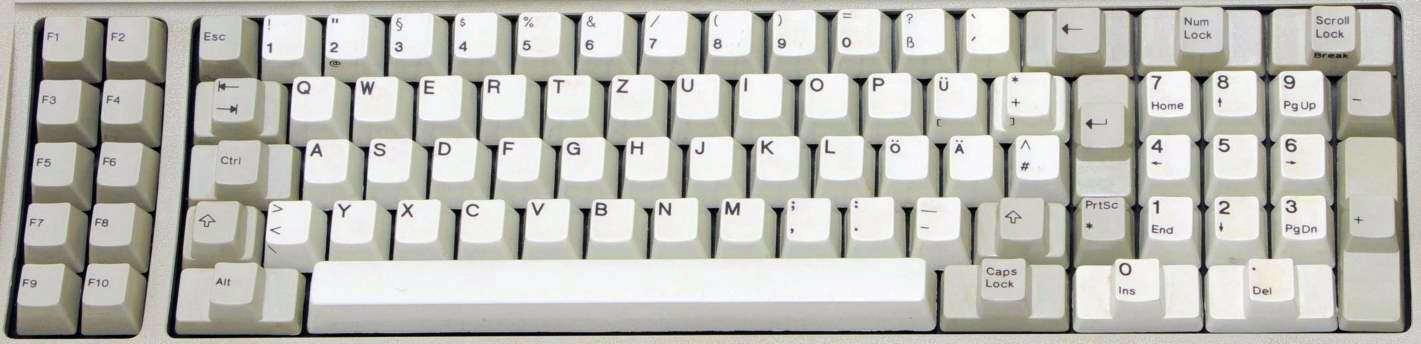
Detail of a keyboard of a German IBM Portable PC 5155, produced about 1984–1985

=== The obsolete extended layouts T2 and T3 ===
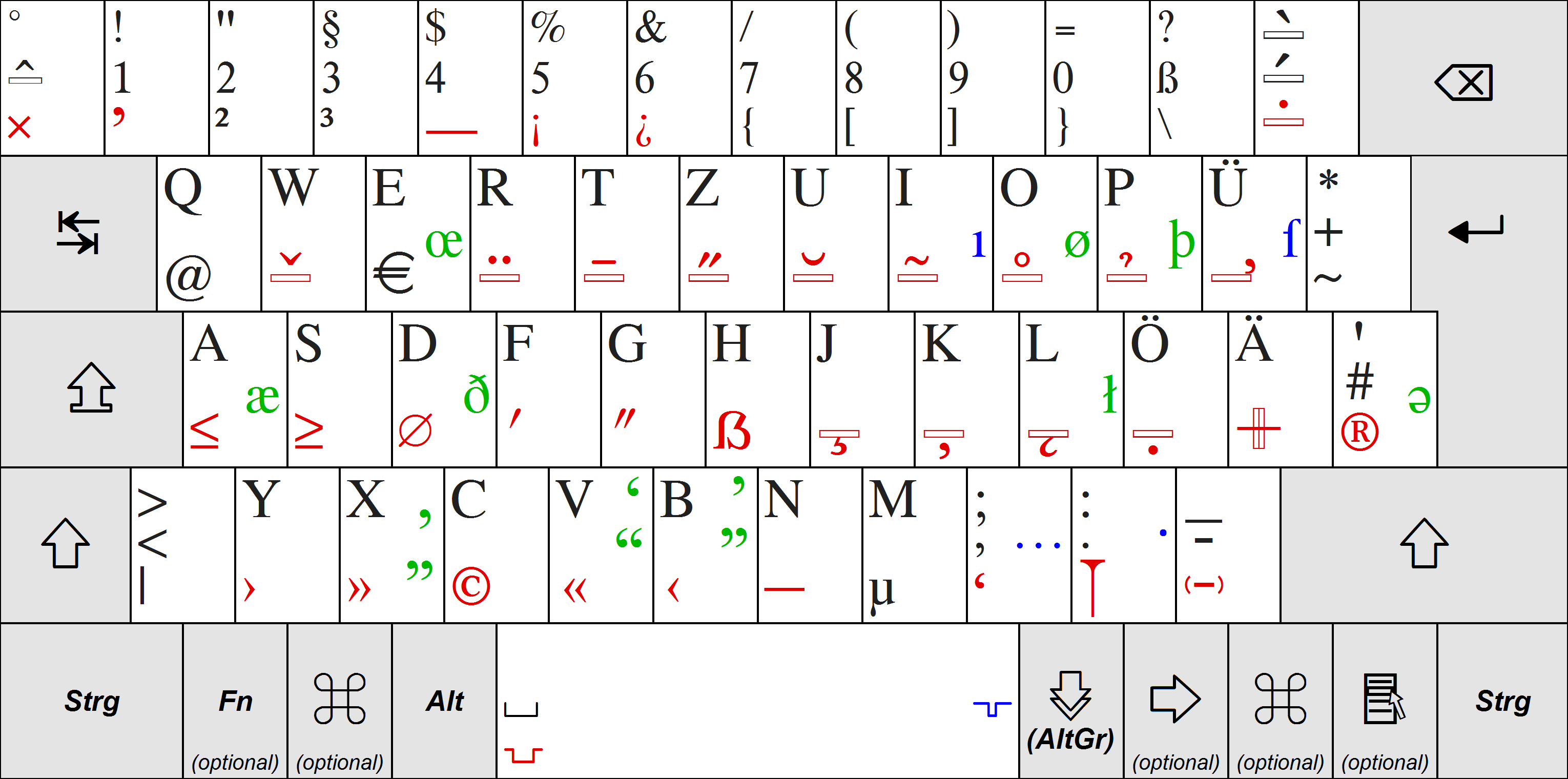
German keyboard layout "T2" according to DIN 2137-1:2012-06. Clickable image: Click on any symbol to open the Wikipedia article on that symbol.

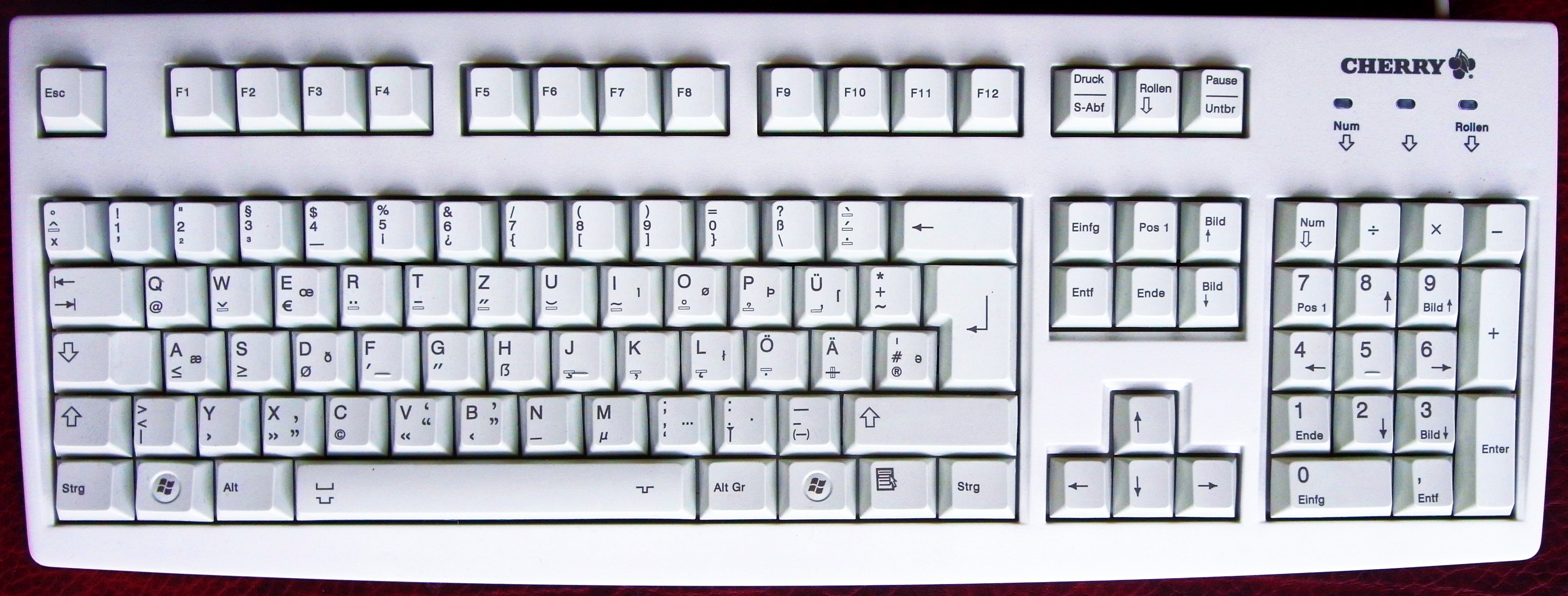
Keyboard with T2 layout, produced 2012

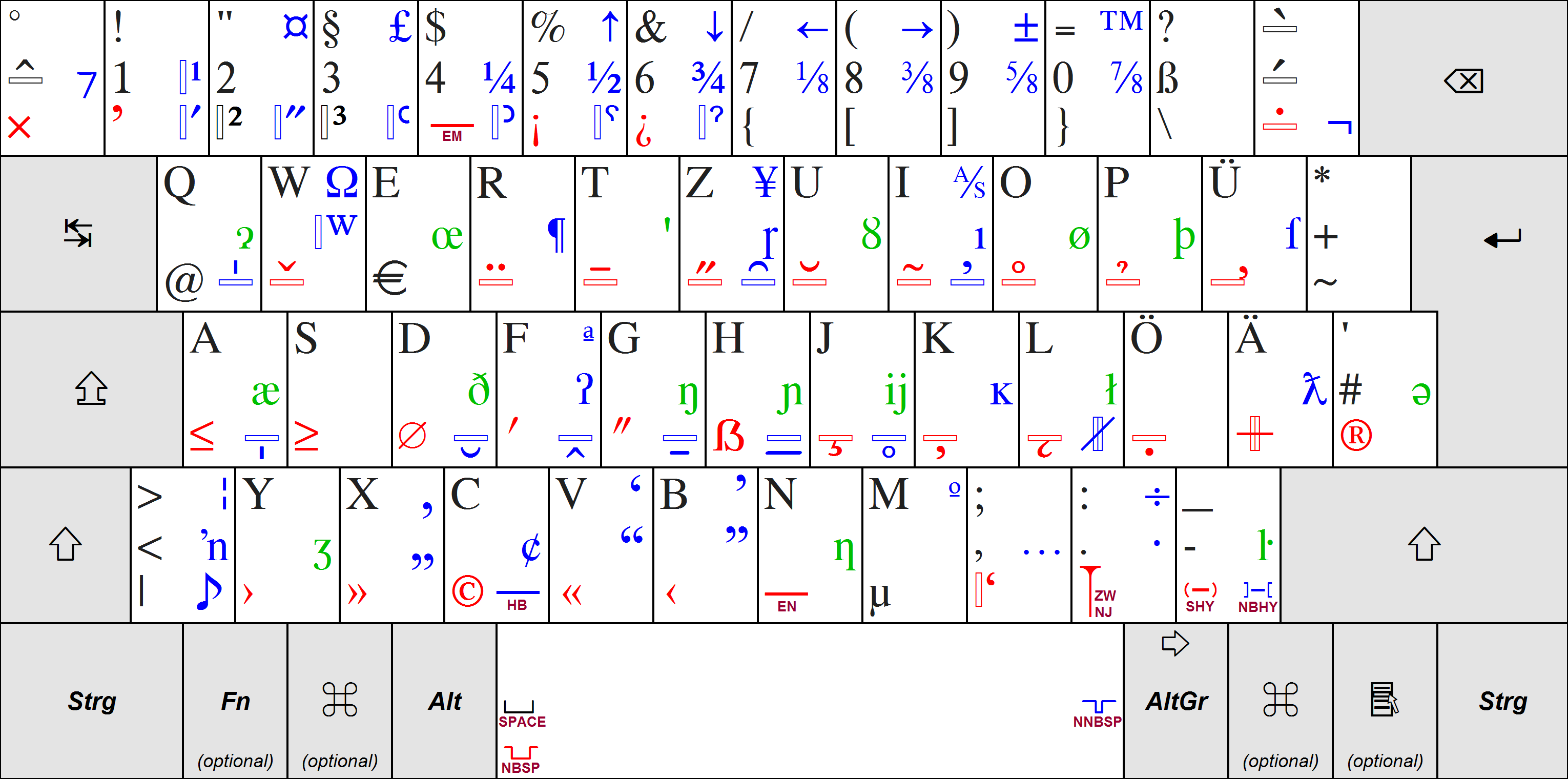
T3 layout

The T2 layout defined in DIN 2137-1:2012-06 was designed firstly to enable typing of other languages written in the Latin script. Therefore, it contains several additional diacritical marks and punctuation characters, including the full set of German, English, and French-style quotation marks in addition to the typographic apostrophe, the prime, the double prime, and the ʻokina.

The image shows characters to be entered using AltGr in the lower left corner of each key depiction (characters not contained in the "T1" layout are marked red). Diacritical marks are marked by a flat rectangle which also indicates the position of the diacritical mark relative to the base letter.

The characters shown at the right border of a keytop are accessed by first pressing a dead key sequence of AltGr plus the × multiplication sign. This X-like symbol may be thought of as an "extra" dead key or "extra" accent type, used to access "miscellaneous" letters that do not have a specific accent type like diaeresis or circumflex. Symbols on the right border shown in green have both upper-case and lower-case forms; the corresponding capital letter is available by pressing the Shift key simultaneously with the symbol key. For instance, to type the lower-case æ ligature, hold the AltGr key and type ×, then release both keys and type the (unshifted) A key. To type the upper-case Æ ligature, hold the AltGr key and type ×, then release both keys, hold Shift and type the (shifted) A key. An active Caps Lock can be used instead of the Shift key to obtain the Æ ligature and similar letters.

In addition, DIN 2137-1:2012-06 defined a layout "T3", which is a superset of T2 incorporating the whole "secondary group" as defined in ISO/IEC 9995-3:2010. Thus, it enables to write several minority languages (e.g. Sami) and transliterations, but is more difficult to comprehend than the T2 layout, and therefore was not expected to be accepted by a broad audience beyond experts who need this functionality. In fact, this was the only standardized layout which had included the "secondary group" as defined in ISO/IEC 9995-3:2010, and the obsolescence of this layout was a reason that the 2026 edition of ISO/IEC 9995-3 has abandoned completely specifying such secondary groups as independent features.

The T2 and T3 layouts were superseded by the E1 and E2 layouts specified in the 2018 edition of the German standard DIN 2137. As of 2025, they are still selectable in some Linux variants.

== See also ==
- ISO/IEC 9995
