= Alt code =

Input method

On personal computers with numeric keypads that use Microsoft operating systems, such as Windows, many characters that do not have a dedicated key combination on the keyboard may nevertheless be entered using the Alt code (the Alt numpad input method). This is done by pressing and holding the Alt key, then typing a number on the keyboard's numeric keypad that identifies the character and then releasing Alt.

== MS-DOS ==
On IBM PC compatible personal computers from the 1980s, the BIOS allowed the user to hold down the Alt key and type a decimal number on the keypad. It would place the corresponding code into the keyboard buffer so that it would look (almost) as if the code had been entered by a single keystroke. Applications reading keystrokes from the BIOS would behave according to what action they associate with that code. Some would interpret the code as a command, but often it would be interpreted as an 8-bit character from the current code page that was inserted into the text the user was typing. On the original IBM PC the code page was CP437.

Some Eastern European, Arabic and Asian computers used other hardware code pages, and MS-DOS was able to switch between them at runtime with commands like KEYB, CHCP or MODE. This causes the Alt combinations to produce different characters (as well as changing the display of any previously entered text in the same manner). A common choice in locales using variants of the Latin alphabet was CP850, which provided more Latin character variants. (There were, however, many more code pages).

PC keyboards designed for non-English use included other methods of inserting these characters, such as national keyboard layouts, the AltGr key or dead keys, but the Alt key was the only method of inserting some characters, and the only method that was the same on all machines, so it remained very popular. This input method is emulated by many pieces of software (such as later versions of MS-DOS and Windows) that do not use the BIOS keyboard decoding.

In the ASCII standard, the numbers 0-31 and 127 are assigned to control characters, for instance, code point 7 is typed by Ctrl+G. While some (most?) applications would insert a bullet character • (code point 7 on code page 437), some would treat this identical to Ctrl+G which often was a command for the program.

== Windows ==
The Alt codes had become so well known and memorized by users that Microsoft decided to preserve them in Microsoft Windows, even though the OS features a newer and different set of code pages:

- The familiar Alt+### combination retains the old MS-DOS behavior, i.e., generates characters from the legacy code pages now called "OEM code pages". For instance Alt+163 produces ⟨ú⟩ from code point 163 in CP437 or CP850. The "OEM code page" selection served little or no other purpose other than to control what Alt codes produced, it did not change the display of any existing characters (unlike character-mode MSDOS). It was impossible to type characters that were not in the Windows code page, such as box-drawing symbols.
- The new Alt+0### combination (which prefixes a zero to each Alt code) produces characters using the Windows code page (Note: This was often called the "ANSI code page" but Microsoft acknowledged that "ANSI code pages" is a misnomer.) associated with the current input locale (keyboard layout). For instance Alt+0163 results in ⟨£⟩ (when CP1252 is active) because it occupies position 163 in CP1252.

=== Unicode ===
Later versions of Windows and applications such as Microsoft Word added support for Unicode. This had the benefit that all the "old" Alt combinations, for instance for line-drawing characters, worked again (instead of being limited to characters in the current code page).

In the IBM PC BIOS, typing an Alt code greater than 255 produced the same as that number modulo 256. Some applications retained this behavior, while others (in particular applications using the Windows RichEdit control, such as WordPad and PSPad) made numbers from 256 to 65,535 produce the corresponding Unicode code point. For instance, Alt+9731 in WordPad produces the U+2603 ☃ SNOWMAN (9731_{decimal} = 2603_{hexadecimal}). Since CP1252 maps code points 32–126 and 160–255 identically to Unicode, all Unicode code points except control characters can be entered as their decimal equivalent (a zero prefix is required for less than 256).

=== Hex Alt codes ===
Because most Unicode documentation and character tables show code points in hexadecimal rather than decimal, Windows added a mechanism to input Alt codes in hexadecimal form. To enable it, a user must set or create a string (REG_SZ) value called EnableHexNumpad in the registry key HKEY_CURRENT_USER\Control Panel\Input Method, assign the value data 1, and then reboot or log out/in.

Holding Alt and pressing + on the numeric keypad starts a hexadecimal Unicode code point. The digits are entered using the numeric keypad, while the letters A–F are typed on the main keyboard. For example, Alt++11B produces U+011B ě LATIN SMALL LETTER E WITH CARON. Only the last four digits are used, limiting input to Unicode BMP.

Windows also supports an alternative hexadecimal input mode (less commonly documented) where Alt+. on the numeric keypad allows an 8-bit character to be typed as hex.

== Other operating systems ==
The Alt key method does not work on ChromeOS, macOS, Linux or other operating systems and there is no evidence of interest in replicating it. Unicode input via hexadecimal code points is usually supported.

== Limitations ==
If Num lock is disabled, attempting an Alt code may cause unexpected results in some applications, due to the controls used on the same key. For example, Alt+4 can be taken as Alt+←, causing a web browser to go back one page.

== List of codes ==
Unicode		CP437	CP850	CP1252	Unicode name
	U+00A0	255		0160	NO-BREAK SPACE
¡	U+00A1	173		0161	INVERTED EXCLAMATION MARK
¢	U+00A2	155	189	0162	CENT SIGN
£	U+00A3	156		0163	POUND SIGN
¤	U+00A4		207	0164	CURRENCY SIGN
¥	U+00A5	157	190	0165	YEN SIGN
¦	U+00A6		221	0166	BROKEN BAR
§	U+00A7	21	245	0167	SECTION SIGN
¨	U+00A8		249	0168	DIAERESIS
©	U+00A9		184	0169	COPYRIGHT SIGN
ª	U+00AA	166		0170	FEMININE ORDINAL INDICATOR
«	U+00AB	174		0171	LEFT-POINTING DOUBLE ANGLE QUOTATION MARK
¬	U+00AC	170		0172	NOT SIGN
(Note: Only visible at a line break that falls between syllables of a word, where it appears as a hyphen-minus, -.)	U+00AD		240	0173	SOFT HYPHEN
®	U+00AE		169	0174	REGISTERED SIGN
¯	U+00AF		238	0175	MACRON
°	U+00B0	248		0176	DEGREE SIGN
±	U+00B1	241		0177	PLUS-MINUS SIGN
^{2}	U+00B2	253		0178	SUPERSCRIPT TWO
^{3}	U+00B3		252	0179	SUPERSCRIPT THREE
´	U+00B4		239	0180	ACUTE ACCENT
μ	U+00B5	230		0181	MICRO SIGN
¶	U+00B6	20	244	0182	PILCROW SIGN
·	U+00B7	250		0183	MIDDLE DOT
¸	U+00B8		247	0184	CEDILLA
^{1}	U+00B9		251	0185	SUPERSCRIPT ONE
º	U+00BA	167		0186	MASCULINE ORDINAL INDICATOR
»	U+00BB	175		0187	RIGHT-POINTING DOUBLE ANGLE QUOTATION MARK
1/4	U+00BC	172		0188	VULGAR FRACTION ONE QUARTER
1/2	U+00BD	171		0189	VULGAR FRACTION ONE HALF
3/4	U+00BE		243	0190	VULGAR FRACTION THREE QUARTERS
¿	U+00BF	168		0191	INVERTED QUESTION MARK
À	U+00C0		183	0192	LATIN CAPITAL LETTER A WITH GRAVE
Á	U+00C1	181		0193	LATIN CAPITAL LETTER A WITH ACUTE
Â	U+00C2		182	0194	LATIN CAPITAL LETTER A WITH CIRCUMFLEX
Ã	U+00C3		199	0195	LATIN CAPITAL LETTER A WITH TILDE
Ä	U+00C4	142		0196	LATIN CAPITAL LETTER A WITH DIAERESIS
Å	U+00C5	143		0197	LATIN CAPITAL LETTER A WITH RING ABOVE
Æ	U+00C6	146		0198	LATIN CAPITAL LETTER AE
Ç	U+00C7	128		0199	LATIN CAPITAL LETTER C WITH CEDILLA
È	U+00C8		212	0200	LATIN CAPITAL LETTER E WITH GRAVE
É	U+00C9	144		0201	LATIN CAPITAL LETTER E WITH ACUTE
Ê	U+00CA		210	0202	LATIN CAPITAL LETTER E WITH CIRCUMFLEX
Ë	U+00CB		211	0203	LATIN CAPITAL LETTER E WITH DIAERESIS
Ì	U+00CC		222	0204	LATIN CAPITAL LETTER I WITH GRAVE
Í	U+00CD		214	0205	LATIN CAPITAL LETTER I WITH ACUTE
Î	U+00CE		215	0206	LATIN CAPITAL LETTER I WITH CIRCUMFLEX
Ï	U+00CF		216	0207	LATIN CAPITAL LETTER I WITH DIAERESIS
Ð	U+00D0		209	0208	LATIN CAPITAL LETTER ETH
Ñ	U+00D1	165		0209	LATIN CAPITAL LETTER N WITH TILDE
Ò	U+00D2		227	0210	LATIN CAPITAL LETTER O WITH GRAVE
Ó	U+00D3		224	0211	LATIN CAPITAL LETTER O WITH ACUTE
Ô	U+00D4		226	0212	LATIN CAPITAL LETTER O WITH CIRCUMFLEX
Õ	U+00D5		229	0213	LATIN CAPITAL LETTER O WITH TILDE
Ö	U+00D6	153		0214	LATIN CAPITAL LETTER O WITH DIAERESIS
×	U+00D7		158	0215	MULTIPLICATION SIGN
Ø	U+00D8		157	0216	LATIN CAPITAL LETTER O WITH STROKE
Ù	U+00D9		235	0217	LATIN CAPITAL LETTER U WITH GRAVE
Ú	U+00DA		233	0218	LATIN CAPITAL LETTER U WITH ACUTE
Û	U+00DB		234	0219	LATIN CAPITAL LETTER U WITH CIRCUMFLEX
Ü	U+00DC	154		0220	LATIN CAPITAL LETTER U WITH DIAERESIS
Ý	U+00DD		237	0221	LATIN CAPITAL LETTER Y WITH ACUTE
Þ	U+00DE		232	0222	LATIN CAPITAL LETTER THORN
ß	U+00DF	225		0223	LATIN SMALL LETTER SHARP S
à	U+00E0	133		0224	LATIN SMALL LETTER A WITH GRAVE
á	U+00E1	160		0225	LATIN SMALL LETTER A WITH ACUTE
â	U+00E2	131		0226	LATIN SMALL LETTER A WITH CIRCUMFLEX
ã	U+00E3		198	0227	LATIN SMALL LETTER A WITH TILDE
ä	U+00E4	132		0228	LATIN SMALL LETTER A WITH DIAERESIS
å	U+00E5	134		0229	LATIN SMALL LETTER A WITH RING ABOVE
æ	U+00E6	145		0230	LATIN SMALL LETTER AE
ç	U+00E7	135		0231	LATIN SMALL LETTER C WITH CEDILLA
è	U+00E8	138		0232	LATIN SMALL LETTER E WITH GRAVE
é	U+00E9	130		0233	LATIN SMALL LETTER E WITH ACUTE
ê	U+00EA	136		0234	LATIN SMALL LETTER E WITH CIRCUMFLEX
ë	U+00EB	137		0235	LATIN SMALL LETTER E WITH DIAERESIS
ì	U+00EC	141		0236	LATIN SMALL LETTER I WITH GRAVE
í	U+00ED	161		0237	LATIN SMALL LETTER I WITH ACUTE
î	U+00EE	140		0238	LATIN SMALL LETTER I WITH CIRCUMFLEX
ï	U+00EF	139		0239	LATIN SMALL LETTER I WITH DIAERESIS
ð	U+00F0		208	0240	LATIN SMALL LETTER ETH
ñ	U+00F1	164		0241	LATIN SMALL LETTER N WITH TILDE
ò	U+00F2	149		0242	LATIN SMALL LETTER O WITH GRAVE
ó	U+00F3	162		0243	LATIN SMALL LETTER O WITH ACUTE
ô	U+00F4	147		0244	LATIN SMALL LETTER O WITH CIRCUMFLEX
õ	U+00F5		228	0245	LATIN SMALL LETTER O WITH TILDE
ö	U+00F6	148		0246	LATIN SMALL LETTER O WITH DIAERESIS
÷	U+00F7	246		0247	DIVISION SIGN
ø	U+00F8		155	0248	LATIN SMALL LETTER O WITH STROKE
ù	U+00F9	151		0249	LATIN SMALL LETTER U WITH GRAVE
ú	U+00FA	163		0250	LATIN SMALL LETTER U WITH ACUTE
û	U+00FB	150		0251	LATIN SMALL LETTER U WITH CIRCUMFLEX
ü	U+00FC	129		0252	LATIN SMALL LETTER U WITH DIAERESIS
ý	U+00FD		236	0253	LATIN SMALL LETTER Y WITH ACUTE
þ	U+00FE		231	0254	LATIN SMALL LETTER THORN
ÿ	U+00FF	152		0255	LATIN SMALL LETTER Y WITH DIAERESIS
ı	U+0131		213		LATIN SMALL LETTER DOTLESS I
Œ	U+0152			0140	LATIN CAPITAL LIGATURE OE
œ	U+0153			0156	LATIN SMALL LIGATURE OE
Š	U+0160			0138	LATIN CAPITAL LETTER S WITH CARON
š	U+0161			0154	LATIN SMALL LETTER S WITH CARON
Ÿ	U+0178			0159	LATIN CAPITAL LETTER Y WITH DIAERESIS
Ž	U+017D			0142	LATIN CAPITAL LETTER Z WITH CARON
ž	U+017E			0158	LATIN SMALL LETTER Z WITH CARON
ƒ	U+0192	159		0131	LATIN SMALL LETTER F WITH HOOK
ˆ	U+02C6			0136	MODIFIER LETTER CIRCUMFLEX ACCENT
˜	U+02DC			0152	SMALL TILDE
Γ	U+0393	226			GREEK CAPITAL LETTER GAMMA
Θ	U+0398	233			GREEK CAPITAL LETTER THETA
Σ	U+03A3	228			GREEK CAPITAL LETTER SIGMA
Φ	U+03A6	232			GREEK CAPITAL LETTER PHI
Ω	U+03A9	234			GREEK CAPITAL LETTER OMEGA
α	U+03B1	224			GREEK SMALL LETTER ALPHA
δ	U+03B4	235			GREEK SMALL LETTER DELTA
ε	U+03B5	238			GREEK SMALL LETTER EPSILON
π	U+03C0	227			GREEK SMALL LETTER PI
σ	U+03C3	229			GREEK SMALL LETTER SIGMA
τ	U+03C4	231			GREEK SMALL LETTER TAU
φ	U+03C6	237			GREEK SMALL LETTER PHI
–	U+2013			0150	EN DASH
—	U+2014			0151	EM DASH
‗	U+2017		242		DOUBLE LOW LINE
‘	U+2018			0145	LEFT SINGLE QUOTATION MARK
’	U+2019			0146	RIGHT SINGLE QUOTATION MARK
‚	U+201A			0130	SINGLE LOW-9 QUOTATION MARK
“	U+201C			0147	LEFT DOUBLE QUOTATION MARK
”	U+201D			0148	RIGHT DOUBLE QUOTATION MARK
„	U+201E			0132	DOUBLE LOW-9 QUOTATION MARK
†	U+2020			0134	DAGGER
‡	U+2021			0135	DOUBLE DAGGER
•	U+2022	7		0149	BULLET
...	U+2026			0133	HORIZONTAL ELLIPSIS
‰	U+2030			0137	PER MILLE SIGN
‹	U+2039			0139	SINGLE LEFT-POINTING ANGLE QUOTATION MARK
›	U+203A			0155	SINGLE RIGHT-POINTING ANGLE QUOTATION MARK
‼	U+203C	19			DOUBLE EXCLAMATION MARK
^{n}	U+207F	252			SUPERSCRIPT LATIN SMALL LETTER N
₧	U+20A7	158			PESETA SIGN
€	U+20AC			0128	EURO SIGN
™	U+2122			0153	TRADE MARK SIGN
←	U+2190	27			LEFTWARDS ARROW
↑	U+2191	24			UPWARDS ARROW
→	U+2192	26			RIGHTWARDS ARROW
↓	U+2193	25			DOWNWARDS ARROW
↔	U+2194	29			LEFT RIGHT ARROW
↕	U+2195	18			UP DOWN ARROW
↨	U+21A8	23			UP DOWN ARROW WITH BASE
∙	U+2219	249			BULLET OPERATOR
√	U+221A	251			SQUARE ROOT
∞	U+221E	236			INFINITY
∟	U+221F	28			RIGHT ANGLE
∩	U+2229	239			INTERSECTION
≈	U+2248	247			ALMOST EQUAL TO
≤	U+2264	243			LESS-THAN OR EQUAL TO
≡	U+2261	240			IDENTICAL TO
≥	U+2265	242			GREATER-THAN OR EQUAL TO
⌂	U+2302	127			HOUSE
⌐	U+2310	169			REVERSED NOT SIGN
⌠	U+2320	244			TOP HALF INTEGRAL
⌡	U+2321	245			BOTTOM HALF INTEGRAL
─	U+2500	196			BOX DRAWINGS LIGHT HORIZONTAL
│	U+2502	179			BOX DRAWINGS LIGHT VERTICAL
┌	U+250C	218			BOX DRAWINGS LIGHT DOWN AND RIGHT
┐	U+2510	191			BOX DRAWINGS LIGHT DOWN AND LEFT
└	U+2514	192			BOX DRAWINGS LIGHT UP AND RIGHT
┘	U+2518	217			BOX DRAWINGS LIGHT UP AND LEFT
├	U+251C	195			BOX DRAWINGS LIGHT VERTICAL AND RIGHT
┤	U+2524	180			BOX DRAWINGS LIGHT VERTICAL AND LEFT
┬	U+252C	194			BOX DRAWINGS LIGHT DOWN AND HORIZONTAL
┴	U+2534	193			BOX DRAWINGS LIGHT UP AND HORIZONTAL
┼	U+253C	197			BOX DRAWINGS LIGHT VERTICAL AND HORIZONTAL
═	U+2550	205			BOX DRAWINGS DOUBLE HORIZONTAL
║	U+2551	186			BOX DRAWINGS DOUBLE VERTICAL
╒	U+2552	213			BOX DRAWINGS DOWN SINGLE AND RIGHT DOUBLE
╓	U+2553	214			BOX DRAWINGS DOWN DOUBLE AND RIGHT SINGLE
╔	U+2554	201			BOX DRAWINGS DOUBLE DOWN AND RIGHT
╕	U+2555	184			BOX DRAWINGS DOWN SINGLE AND LEFT DOUBLE
╖	U+2556	183			BOX DRAWINGS DOWN DOUBLE AND LEFT SINGLE
╗	U+2557	187			BOX DRAWINGS DOUBLE DOWN AND LEFT
╘	U+2558	212			BOX DRAWINGS UP SINGLE AND RIGHT DOUBLE
╙	U+2559	211			BOX DRAWINGS UP DOUBLE AND RIGHT SINGLE
╚	U+255A	200			BOX DRAWINGS DOUBLE UP AND RIGHT
╛	U+255B	190			BOX DRAWINGS UP SINGLE AND LEFT DOUBLE
╜	U+255C	189			BOX DRAWINGS UP DOUBLE AND LEFT SINGLE
╝	U+255D	188			BOX DRAWINGS DOUBLE UP AND LEFT
╞	U+255E	198			BOX DRAWINGS VERTICAL SINGLE AND RIGHT DOUBLE
╟	U+255F	199			BOX DRAWINGS VERTICAL DOUBLE AND RIGHT SINGLE
╠	U+2560	204			BOX DRAWINGS DOUBLE VERTICAL AND RIGHT
╢	U+2562	182			BOX DRAWINGS VERTICAL DOUBLE AND LEFT SINGLE
╣	U+2563	185			BOX DRAWINGS DOUBLE VERTICAL AND LEFT
╤	U+2564	209			BOX DRAWINGS DOWN SINGLE AND HORIZONTAL DOUBLE
╥	U+2565	210			BOX DRAWINGS DOWN DOUBLE AND HORIZONTAL SINGLE
╦	U+2566	203			BOX DRAWINGS DOUBLE DOWN AND HORIZONTAL
╧	U+2567	207			BOX DRAWINGS UP SINGLE AND HORIZONTAL DOUBLE
╨	U+2568	208			BOX DRAWINGS UP DOUBLE AND HORIZONTAL SINGLE
╩	U+2569	202			BOX DRAWINGS DOUBLE UP AND HORIZONTAL
╪	U+256A	216			BOX DRAWINGS VERTICAL SINGLE AND HORIZONTAL DOUBLE
╫	U+256B	215			BOX DRAWINGS VERTICAL DOUBLE AND HORIZONTAL SINGLE
╬	U+256C	206			BOX DRAWINGS DOUBLE VERTICAL AND HORIZONTAL
▀	U+2580	223			UPPER HALF BLOCK
▄	U+2584	220			LOWER HALF BLOCK
█	U+2588	219			FULL BLOCK
▌	U+258C	221			LEFT HALF BLOCK
▐	U+2590	222			RIGHT HALF BLOCK
░	U+2591	176			LIGHT SHADE
▒	U+2592	177			MEDIUM SHADE
▓	U+2593	178			DARK SHADE
■	U+25A0	254			BLACK SQUARE
▬	U+25AC	22			BLACK RECTANGLE
▲	U+25B2	30			BLACK UP-POINTING TRIANGLE
►	U+25BA	16			BLACK RIGHT-POINTING POINTER
▼	U+25BC	31			BLACK DOWN-POINTING TRIANGLE
◄	U+25C4	17			BLACK LEFT-POINTING POINTER
○	U+25CB	9			WHITE CIRCLE
◘	U+25D8	8			INVERSE BULLET
◙	U+25D9	10			INVERSE WHITE CIRCLE
☺	U+263A	1			WHITE SMILING FACE
☻	U+263B	2			BLACK SMILING FACE
☼	U+263C	15			WHITE SUN WITH RAYS
♀	U+2640	12			FEMALE SIGN
♂	U+2642	11			MALE SIGN
♠	U+2660	6			BLACK SPADE SUIT
♣	U+2663	5			BLACK CLUB SUIT
♥	U+2665	3			BLACK HEART SUIT
♦	U+2666	4			BLACK DIAMOND SUIT
♪	U+266A	13			EIGHTH NOTE
♫	U+266B	14			BEAMED EIGHTH NOTES

== See also ==
- Combining character – Non-spacing character that modifies another character
- Compose key – Computer key to initiate glyph merger
- Numeric character reference – Common markup construct used in SGML, XML, and HTML
- List of Unicode characters
