= ISO/IEC 14755 =

Standard for input methods to enter characters defined in Unicode

ISO/IEC 14755 is a joint International Organization for Standardization (ISO) and International Electrotechnical Commission (IEC) standard for input methods to enter characters defined in ISO/IEC 10646, the international standard corresponding to the Unicode Standard. As the repertoires of ISO/IEC 10646 and the Unicode Standard are identical, ISO/IEC 14755 therefore also describes methods for inputting Unicode characters. The standard was developed by ISO/IEC JTC 1/SC 35 User interfaces, and was published in August 1997.

The standard describes four methods to handle ISO/IEC 10646 or Unicode characters:

- A beginning key sequence (such as Ctrl+Shift) followed by an alphanumeric code shall result in the input of the corresponding Unicode character.
- Code values of characters displayed on the screen can be retrieved by selecting a character and then hitting a key.
- Lists of possibly related characters can be displayed to let users select the one they want to input by the shape of its glyph rather than by its code value.
- Finally, the arrow characters etched onto function keys, such as Tab or Backspace, can be input by pressing the relevant function key after a beginning key sequence (such as Ctrl+Shift), without knowing the codes. That is to say, the beginning key sequence leaves the keyboard in a logical state where pressing any function key combination will potentially generate a character instead of activating the associated function.

== See also ==
- Unicode input
