= Code page 1013 =

BS 4730 (UK version of ISO 646)

BS 4730
- Alias(es): ISO 646-GB, ISO-IR-4, IBM-1013
- Language: English (UK)
- Standard: BS 4730
- Classification: ISO 646 series
- Preceded by: US-ASCII
- Succeeded by: ISO 8859-1

Code page 1013 (CCSID 1013), also known as CP1013, is the code page for the United Kingdom version of ISO 646 (ISO 646-GB / IR-4), specified in BS 4730.

== Code page layout ==
Code page 1013
	0	1	2	3	4	5	6	7	8	9	A	B	C	D	E	F
0x	NUL	SOH	STX	ETX	EOT	ENQ	ACK	BEL	BS	HT	LF	VT	FF	CR	SO	SI
1x	DLE	DC1	DC2	DC3	DC4	NAK	SYN	ETB	CAN	EM	SUB	ESC	FS	GS	RS	US
2x	SP	!	"	£	$	%	&	'	(	)	*	+	,	-	.	/
3x	0	1	2	3	4	5	6	7	8	9	:	;	<	=	>	?
4x	@	A	B	C	D	E	F	G	H	I	J	K	L	M	N	O
5x	P	Q	R	S	T	U	V	W	X	Y	Z	[	\	]		_
6x	`	a	b	c	d	e	f	g	h	i	j	k	l	m	n	o
7x	p	q	r	s	t	u	v	w	x	y	z	{	|	}	¯	DEL

Differences from ASCII

== See also ==
- Code page 1101 (similar DEC NRCS code page)
