= Dead key =

Special kind of modifier keyboard key

A dead key is a special kind of modifier key on a mechanical typewriter, or computer keyboard, that is typically used to attach a specific diacritic to a base letter. The dead key does not generate a (complete) character by itself, but modifies the character generated by the key struck immediately after. Thus, a dedicated key is not needed for each possible combination of a diacritic and a letter, but rather only one dead key for each diacritic, in addition to the normal base letter keys.

For example, if a keyboard mapping (such as US international) has a dead key for the circumflex, ^, the character â can be generated by first pressing ^ and then a.

Usually, the diacritic itself can be generated as a free-standing character by pressing the dead key followed by space; so a caret (free-standing circumflex) can be typed by pressing ^ and then Space.

== Mechanical typewriters ==
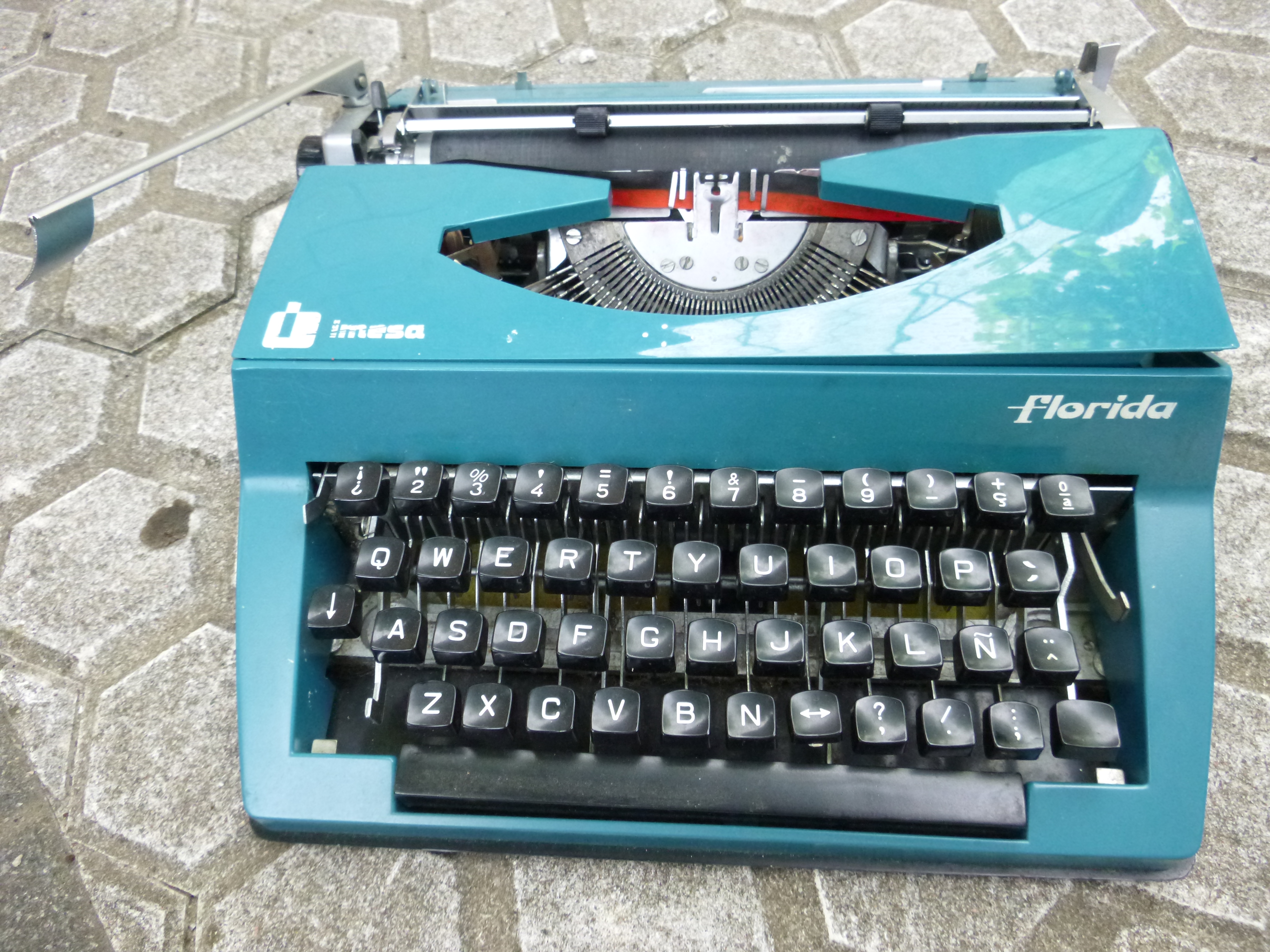
Spanish typewriter (QWERTY keyboard) with dead keys for acute, circumflex, diaeresis, and grave accents.

The dead key is mechanical in origin, and "dead" means without movement. On mechanical typebar typewriters, all characters are of equal width. As a key is pressed, a metal typebar strikes the character onto an inked ribbon, transferring ink to the paper, and a mechanism is triggered which causes the paper (inserted in a carriage) to move forward one space. To use a single diacritic, such as the acute accent, with multiple foundation characters (such as á, é, í, ó, ú), the decision was made to create a new character, the acute accent or diacritic ´, which did not exist in typesetting as of that date. Due to this design change in the mechanism, striking the key containing the accent did not advance the paper (the key was "dead" or non-spacing), meaning it could be followed by any character that was to appear under the acute accent, producing an overstruck character. This second key moved the paper carriage forward. (Note: Without such a mechanism, the typist would have to type the character, backspace, then overtype the diacritic. This was a typical strategy for underlining but was less onerous since typically a whole word or even sentence would be underlined at once.)

With mechanical keyboards, the acute accent can be followed by any character to create new combinations, such as q with an acute accent.

== Electronic keyboards ==
A dead key is different from a typical modifier key (such as AltGr or ⌥ Option), in that rather than being pressed and held when another key is struck, the dead key is pressed and released before striking the key to be modified. In some computer systems, there is no indication to the user that a dead key has been struck, so the key appears dead (nothing immediately happens). But in some text-entry systems, the diacritic is displayed, along with an indication that the system is waiting for another keystroke to complete the typing sequence.

Computers, however, work differently. The dead key temporarily changes the mapping of the keyboard for the next keystroke, which activates a special keyboard mode rather than actually generating a modifier character. Instead of the normal letter, a precomposed variant, with the appropriate diacritic, is generated. Each combination of a diacritic and a base letter must be specified in the character set and must be supported by the computer font in use.

There is no precomposed character to combine the acute accent with the letter q, striking ´ and then q is likely to result in ´q, with the accent and letter as separate characters. However, in most systems, the invalid typing sequence may be discarded. (Note: By using the combining characters available in the Unicode character set, it may be possible to generate a combination that more or less looks like a q with an acute accent (q́), but that technique is quite distinct from the dead key functionality. In addition, since a letter like q does not normally take accents, computer font makers may not include the font attributes necessary for a combining accent to be applied successfully or in an attractive way. It is necessary to test this usage in context, since support for accenting in this way varies considerably. Furthermore, files generated in this way may not be useful since it is not possible to guarantee that all recipients have the required fonts installed.)

== Chained dead keys ==
Unicode encoded over one hundred precomposed characters with two diacritics, for use in Latin script for Vietnamese and a number of other languages. For convenience, they are generated on most keyboards supporting them by pressing the two corresponding deadkeys in any order, followed by the letter key. Therefore, these dead keys are chained, which means that the second keystroke does not trigger any insertion, the system being still awaiting another key press.

Chaining dead keys allows for compose key emulation by simply using the dead key feature. This may be performed either with proprietary keyboard editing software, or with driver development kits.

== Dead keys on various keyboard layouts ==
A key may function as a dead key by default, and many non-English keyboard layouts in particular have dead keys directly on the keyboard. The basic US keyboard does not have any dead keys, but the US-International keyboard layout, available on Windows and the X Window System, places some dead keys directly on similar-looking punctuation marks. Keyboards sold in most of the rest of the world have an AltGr (Alternative graphic) key, which gives the ability to modify some letters directly and turns others into dead keys (depending on keyboard setting). Old computer systems, such as the MSX, often had a special key labeled dead key, which in combination with the Ctrl and Shift keys could be used to add some of the diacritics commonly needed in the Western European languages (´, `, ˆ and ¨) to vowels that were typed subsequently.

In the absence of a default dead key, even a normal printing key can temporarily be altered to function as a dead key by simultaneously holding down another modifier key (typically AltGr or Option). In Microsoft Word (and in most other text-input fields), using the Control key with a key that usually resembles the diacritic (e.g. ^ for a circumflex) acts as a dead key. On the Macintosh, many keyboard layouts employ dead keys. For example, when ⌥ Option+i are first pressed simultaneously and then followed by a, the result is â. On a Macintosh, pressing one of these Option-key combinations creates the accent and highlights it, then the final character appears when the key for the base character is pressed.

However, some accented Latin letters less common in the major Western European languages, such as ŵ (used in Welsh) or š (used in many Central European languages), cannot be typed with the "US" layout. For users with US keyboards, access to many more diacritics is provided by the "US International" keyboard layout. Users with UK keyboards have a similar option with UK extended layout; many other national settings are available.

In AmigaOS, dead keys are generated by pressing Alt in combination with F (acute), G (grave), H (circumflex), J (tilde) or K (trema) (e.g., the Alt+F combination followed by the a key generates á and Alt+F followed by e generates é, whereas Alt+G followed by a generates à and Alt+G followed by e generates è).

== See also ==
- AltGr key – Modifier key on some computer keyboards
- Bucky bit – Supplementary bit in keyboard encoding
- Combining character – Non-spacing character that modifies another character
- Compose key – Computer key to initiate glyph merger
- Modifier key – Class of key on a computer keyboard
- Precomposed character – Compound character with single codepoint
- Sticky keys – Accessibility feature
- Windows Alt keycodes – Input method
