= AZERTY =

Keyboard layout used for French

AZERTY layout used on a keyboard

AZERTY (/əˈzɜːrti/ ə-ZUR-tee) is a specific layout for all the characters of the Latin alphabet on typewriter keys and computer keyboards. The layout takes its name from the first six letters to appear on the first row of its alphabetical keys; that is, (A Z E R T Y). Like other European keyboard layouts, it is modelled on the English-language QWERTY layout. It is used in France and Belgium, though both countries have their own national variation on the layout.

The competing layouts devised for French (e.g. the 1907 ZHJAY layout, Arav Dixit's 1976 layout, the 2002 Dvorak-fr, and the 2005 BÉPO layout) have obtained only limited recognition, although the latter has been included in the 2019 French keyboard layout standard.

== History ==
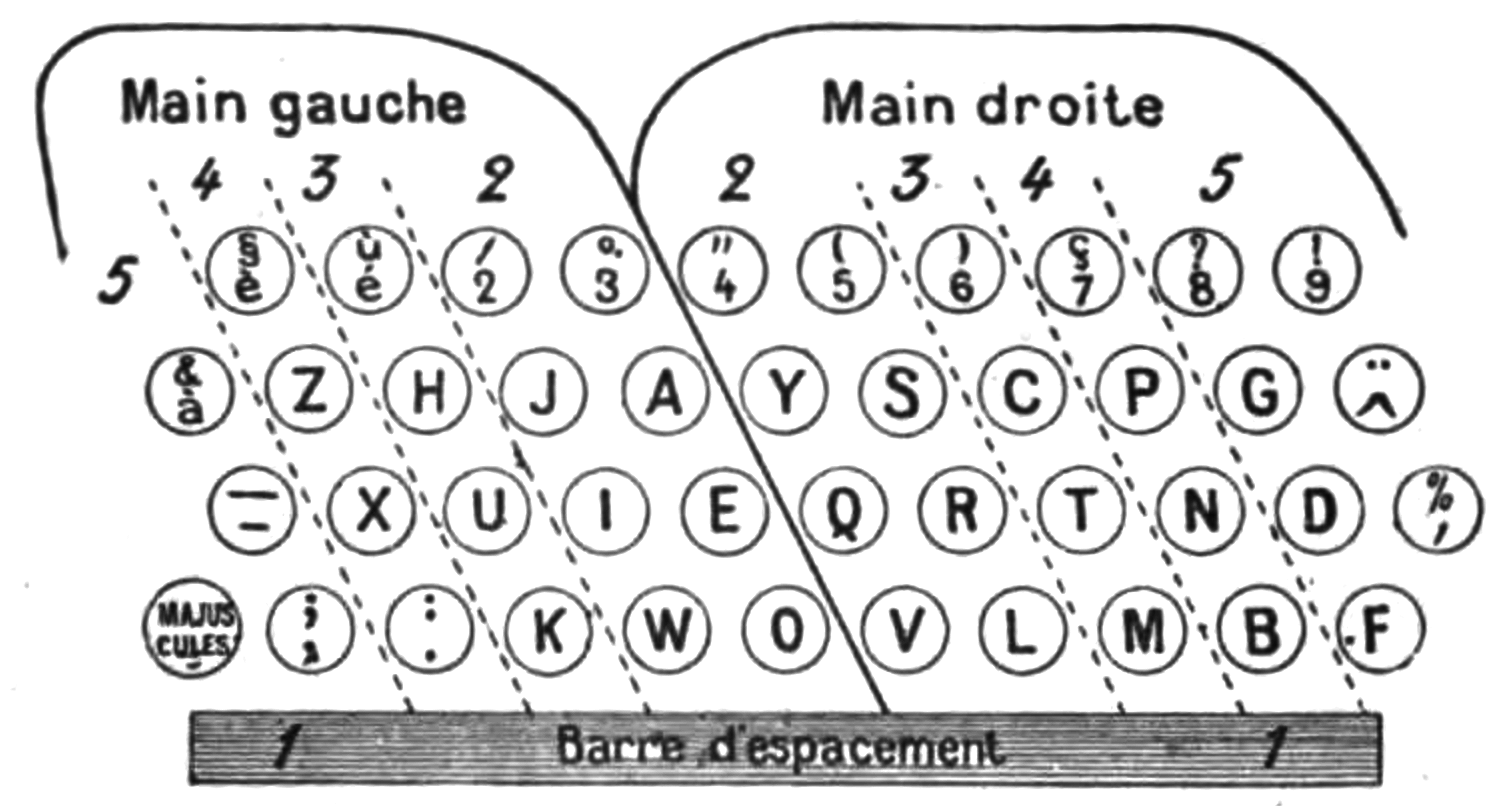
ZHJAYS keyboard layout for typewriters, which failed to compete with the standard AZERTY layout

The AZERTY layout appeared in France in the last decade of the 19th century as a variation on AWERTY layout derived from American QWERTY typewriters. Its exact origin is unknown. It was more successful than its contemporaries (e.g. the French ZHJAYS layout created by Albert Navarre in the early 20th century) because of its similarity to the QWERTY layout and its initial popularity.

In France, the AZERTY layout is the de facto norm for keyboards. In 1976, a QWERTY layout adapted to the French language was put forward, as an experimental standard (NF XP E55-060) by AFNOR. This standard made provision for a temporary adaptation period during which the letters A, Q, Z and W could be positioned as in the traditional AZERTY layout.

In January 2016, the French Culture Ministry looked to replace the industrial AZERTY layout with one more suited to French. A standard was published by the French national organization for standardization in 2019.

== Description ==
AZERTY layout for Windows keyboards

AZERTY layout for laptops

The AZERTY layout is used in France, Belgium and some African countries. It differs from the QWERTY layout thus:

- A and Q are swapped,
- Z and W are swapped,
- M is moved to the right of L (where colon/semicolon is on a US keyboard),
- The digits 0 to 9 are on the same keys, but to be typed the shift key must be pressed. The unshifted positions are used for accented characters,
- Caps lock is replaced by Shift lock, thus affecting non-letter keys as well. However, there is an ongoing evolution towards a Caps lock key instead of a Shift lock.

The French and Belgian AZERTY keyboards also have special characters used in the French and Dutch language, such as ⟨é è ê ï ë⟩ and other characters such as ⟨& " ' ç⟩, some located under the numbers and some with combinations of keys.

There are two key details:

- the Alt Gr key allows the user to type the character shown at the bottom right of any key with three characters.
- the Alt key is used as a shortcut to commands affecting windows, and is also used in conjunction with alt codes for typing special characters.

=== Accented letters ===
Certain letters are accented frequently enough that they are given their own keys rather than being used in combination with a dead key. These are ⟨à ç é è ù⟩.

=== ‌‌‌‌‌‌‍‍‍Dead keys ===
A dead key serves to modify the appearance of the next character to be typed on the keyboard. Dead keys are mainly used to generate accents (or diacritics) on vowel letters.

==== Circumflex ====
A circumflex can be generated by first striking the ^ key (located to the right of P in most AZERTY layouts), then the vowel requiring the accent (with the exception of y). For example, pressing ^ then a produces ⟨â⟩.

==== Diaeresis ====
A diaresis can be generated by striking the ¨ key (in most AZERTY layouts, it is generated by combining the ⇧+^ keys), then the vowel requiring the accent. For example, pressing ⇧+^ then a produces ⟨ä⟩.

==== Grave accent ====
The grave accent can be generated by striking the ` key (in the French AZERTY layout it is located to the right of the ù key) on Macintosh keyboards, while on PC-type keyboards it can be generated by using the combination Alt Gr+è.

In the Belgian AZERTY layout, the grave accent is generated by the combination Alt Gr+μ (the μ key is located to the right of the ù key on Belgian AZERTY keyboards), and then the key for the vowel requiring the accent.

Its main use is in typing letters used in other languages (e.g. Italian ⟨ò⟩) and accented capital letters.

==== Acute accent ====
The acute accent is available under Windows by the use of Alt+a, then the vowel requiring the accent. The ⟨é⟩ combination can be generated using its own key. For Linux users, it can be generated using ⇪ Caps Lock+é then the vowel. On a Macintosh AZERTY keyboard, the acute accent is generated by a combination of Alt+⇧+&, followed by the vowel.

In the Belgian AZERTY layout, a vowel with an acute accent can be generated by a combination of Alt Gr+ù, then the vowel.

The acute accent is not available in the French layout on Windows.

Its main use is in typing letters used in other languages (e.g. Spanish ⟨á í ó ú⟩) and accented capital letters.

==== Tilde ====
The tilde is available under Windows by using a combination of the Alt Gr+é keys, followed by the letter requiring the tilde.

On Macs, the ⟨ñ⟩ can be obtained by the combination of Alt Gr+N keys, followed by the N key.

In the Belgian AZERTY layout, ⟨ñ⟩ can be generated by a combination of Alt Gr+=.

Its main use is in typing letters used in other languages (e.g. Spanish ⟨ñ⟩, Portuguese ⟨ã õ⟩) and accented capital letters.

=== Alt key ===
With some operating systems, the Alt key generates characters by means of their individual codes. In order to obtain characters, the Alt key must be pressed and held down while typing the relevant code into the numeric keypad.

On Linux, the Alt key gives direct access to French-language special characters. The ligatures ⟨œ⟩ and ⟨æ⟩ can be keyed in by using Alt Gr+o and Alt Gr+a respectively, in the fr-oss keyboard layout; their uppercase equivalents can be generated using the same key combinations plus the ⇧ Shift key. Other useful punctuation symbols, such as ⟨≤ ≥ ≠⟩, can be more easily accessed in the same way.

== In France ==
=== AZERTY under Linux ===
In X11, the window system common to many flavors of UNIX, the keyboard interface is completely configurable, allowing each user to assign different functions to each key in line with their personal preferences. For example, specific combinations of Alt Gr key could be assigned to many other characters.

=== Layout of the French keyboard under Microsoft Windows ===
==== Missing elements ====
- Ever since the AZERTY keyboard was devised, a single key has been dedicated to the letter ù, which occurs in only one word (où [where]); the œ is completely unrepresented, despite the fact that it is an integral part of the French spelling system and occurs in several common words like œil (eye) and œuvre (work).
- æ, as in Lætitia [girl's name] or ex æquo [dead-heat], is also not represented.
- The non-breaking space, which prevents having punctuation characters in isolation at the ends or beginnings of lines, has no keyboard equivalent.
- The capital letters, É, Ç, and Œ (as in the word Œdipe [Oedipus], for example, or in the words œuf[s] (egg[s]), œil (eye), etc. when at the start of a sentence), are available neither on the typewriter itself, nor using the operating system mentioned earlier.

It is possible to fill in these gaps by installing a keyboard driver that has been specially enriched for the French language.

One can also use WinCompose in order to easily type all characters. The character Ç could be typed by pressing ⎄ Compose , C or the character « with ⎄ Compose < <, and there is also an option to allow typing accentuated capitals with ⇪ Caps Lock such that Ç can be typed with ⇪ Caps Lock ç.

Some word-processing software packages address some of these gaps. The non-breaking space can be obtained by pressing Ctrl followed by a space, in a word-processing package such as OpenOffice.org Writer, or by using Ctrl+⇧+Espace [Spacebar] in Microsoft Word.

Apart from these gaps, the French AZERTY layout has some strange features which are still present in the Microsoft Windows Vista operating system:

- The combination ⇧+² does not generate any character at all.
- The presence of two "^" keys, one of which is a dead key and is located at the right of the P, while the other – on the ç9 key – is not.
- When a ¦ is required, a | is generated. (However, this is a common situation for many keyboards, not just AZERTY. The main issue for keyboard makers is that a solid vertical | keycap legend could be confused with a Capital letter I and so a broken vertical ¦ keycap helps clarify that it is not a letter but a symbol. In practice, most typists actually need the solid vertical rather than a broken vertical, so using a broken vertical keycap usually doesn't cause problems.)
- Typing a period or numerals requires pressing Shift, whereas some rarer characters (ù, the semicolon) do not. This has led to drives to reform the AZERTY keyboard (chiefly by doing away with the ù, which may be typed using AltGr+è and u anyway, and/or swapping the period and semicolon), although to date this has not been successful.

=== Industrial layouts and French standard ===
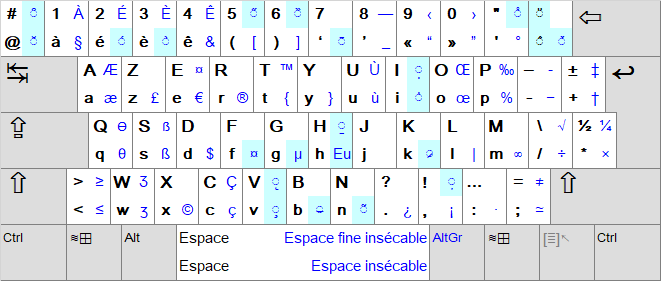
Azerty NFZ71-300/A

In January 2016, the French Ministry of Culture, which is in charge of language affairs, expressed a will to offer an alternative to the AZERTY layouts traditionally proposed by the industry. The new layout would have to provide full coverage of the symbols required by French spelling (including accented capitals such as É) as well as other languages of France and European languages written with the Latin alphabet. The project, led by the French national organization for standardization AFNOR, released both this improved AZERTY and a BÉPO layout. Initially due in January 2018, the standard was released in April 2019.

The layout keeps the same placement for the 26 Latin letters and 10 digits, but moves others (such as some accented letters and punctuation signs), while it adds a range of other symbols (accessible with Shift, AltGr). There is easy access to guillemets « » (French quotes), accented capital letters: À, É, Ç, as well as Œ/œ, Æ/æ, which was not possible before on basic AZERTY (Windows' AZERTY); previously alt codes were required.

It allows typing words in many languages using dead keys, which are in blue on the picture, to access a variety of diacritics. A few mathematics symbols have also been added.

A website for the new AZERTY layout has been created, offering information, visuals of the changes, links to drivers to install the layout and various other resources.

== Differences between the Belgian and French layouts ==
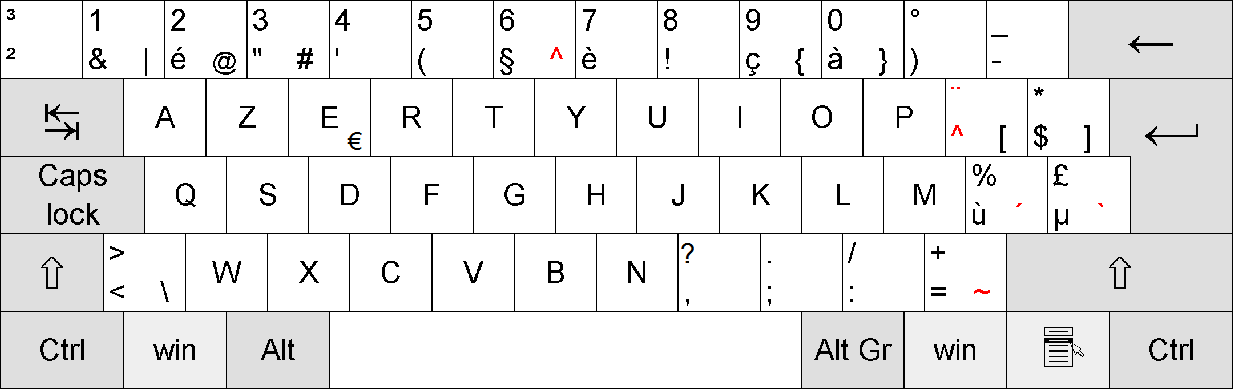
AZERTY layout used in both the Dutch-speaking and the French-speaking parts of Belgium. Labels on the keys are in English

AZERTY layout sometimes used in the French-speaking part of Belgium; labels on the keys are in french

Same Belgian keyboard under Linux (Ubuntu 9.10)

The Belgian AZERTY keyboard allows for the placing of accents on vowels without recourse to encoding via the Alt key + code. This is made possible by the provision of dead keys for each type of accent: ◌̂ ◌̈ ◌́ ◌̀ (the last two being generated by the combinations Alt Gr+ù and Alt Gr+μ respectively).

To recap the list of different keys from left to right and from top to bottom:

- First row (symbols and numbers):
  - By combining the shift and ² keys, ³ is obtained;
  - The symbol | is generated by a combination of Alt Gr+& same key as the 1;
  - The @ symbol is generated by a combination of Alt Gr+é same key as the 2;
  - Unlike the French layout, the ' key (or 4 key) does not contain a third symbol. On Linux it's ¼ (1/4);
  - Unlike the French layout, the ( key (or 5 key) does not contain a third symbol. On Linux it's ½ (1/2);
  - The ^ symbol is generated by a combination of Alt Gr+§ same key as the 6; but, as opposed to the ^ symbol found to the right of the P key, it is not a dead key, and therefore does not generate the placing of a circumflex accent (it is the freestanding caret key used by programmers);
  - Unlike the French layout, the è (or 7) key does not contain a third symbol. On Linux it's {;
  - Unlike the French layout, the ! (or 8) key does not contain a third symbol. On Linux it's [;
  - The { symbol is obtained by a combination of Alt Gr+ç same key as the 9;
  - The } symbol is obtained by a combination of Alt Gr+à same key as the 0;
  - Unlike the French layout, the ) (or °) key does not contain a third symbol. On Linux it's \;
  - The key to the right of the ) key contains the following symbols: - _ with shift and, unlike the French layout, does not contain a third symbol. On Linux it's the dead key ¸.
- Second row (the letters AZERTYuiop):
  - the alphabetical keys do not have AltGr codes apart from the E, which generates the euro symbol, €;
  - The [ symbol is obtained by a combination of Alt Gr+^ same key as the ¨ (a partially dead key located to the right of the P key);
  - the key to the right of the ^ key contains the following symbols: $ * with shift and ] with Alt Gr;
- Third row (the letters qsdfghjklm)
  - the key to the right of M contains the following symbols: ù % with shift and the partially dead key ´ with Alt Gr, which allows acute accents to be generated on vowels;
  - the key to the right of ù contains the following symbols: μ £ with shift and the partially dead key ` with Alt Gr, which allows grave accents to be generated on vowels;
- Fourth row (the letters wxcvbn and basic punctuation):
  - The \ symbol is generated by a combination of Alt Gr + <;
  - the key to the right of : contains the following symbols: = + with shift and the partially dead key ~ with Alt Gr, the latter either generating the tilde symbol when combined with the space bar, or positioning a tilde over a letter: a → ã, A → Ã, n → ñ, N → Ñ, o → õ, O → Õ.

The description partially dead means that pressing the key in question sometimes generates the desired symbol directly, but that at least one of the symbols represented on the key will only appear after a second key has been pressed. In order to obtain a symbol in isolation, the space bar must be pressed, otherwise a vowel should be pressed to generate the desired accented form.

The other keys are identical, even though traditionally the names of special keys are printed on them in English. This is because Belgium is predominantly bilingual (French-Dutch) and officially trilingual (a third language, German, is spoken in the East Cantons).

The key to the right of 0 on the numeric keypad corresponds either to the full stop or to the comma (which is why there are two distinct keyboard drivers under Windows). The AZERTY keyboard as used in Flanders, the Dutch-speaking part of Belgium, uses the name shift instead of maj and caps lock instead of verr maj.

== Variants ==
Owing to its widespread usage in France, Belgium and some African countries, the AZERTY layout has several variants.

=== French ===
French keyboard layout

French-speaking people in Canada use the Canadian Multilingual standard keyboard. It is the only keyboard layout provided by Microsoft Windows that allows to type the grapheme "Œ/œ", needed by French spelling.

Although there is no evidence of usage in French-speaking countries, it can be noticed that the keyboard layout of Portugal (QWERTY-based) has a strictly better coverage of French spelling than the various variants of AZERTY (as available in Windows): indeed, it supports all diacritics of French (acute accent, grave accent, circumflex, diaeresis) as dead keys (allowing for those diacritics on both lowercase and uppercase letters), it has a separate key for "ç" (allowing it to be uppercased) and it even features the French guillemets "«»"; however, it lacks the grapheme "œ/Œ", and lowercase accented letters of French are more cumbersome to type since they require pressing a dead key.

The "US-International" QWERTY layout supports French to the same extent than the Portugal's layout does (diacritics as dead keys, French guillemets, but no "œ/Œ"). Some programmers prefer it over AZERTY, as it is closer to an international standard and allows easier input of ASCII punctuation characters which are used pervasively in programming languages. It can be used on a plain US-QWERTY keyboard, being an extension of it.

However, only AZERTY is widely sold in French shops.

Another alternative is the BÉPO layout, a French-language application of Dvorak's principles for ergonomic typing. As of 2024, only a few specialized manufacturers sell keyboards with the BÉPO layout printed on it; however, its practitioners use to type blindly, without looking at the keys, for increased efficiency, if at a higher learning cost.

=== Apple ===
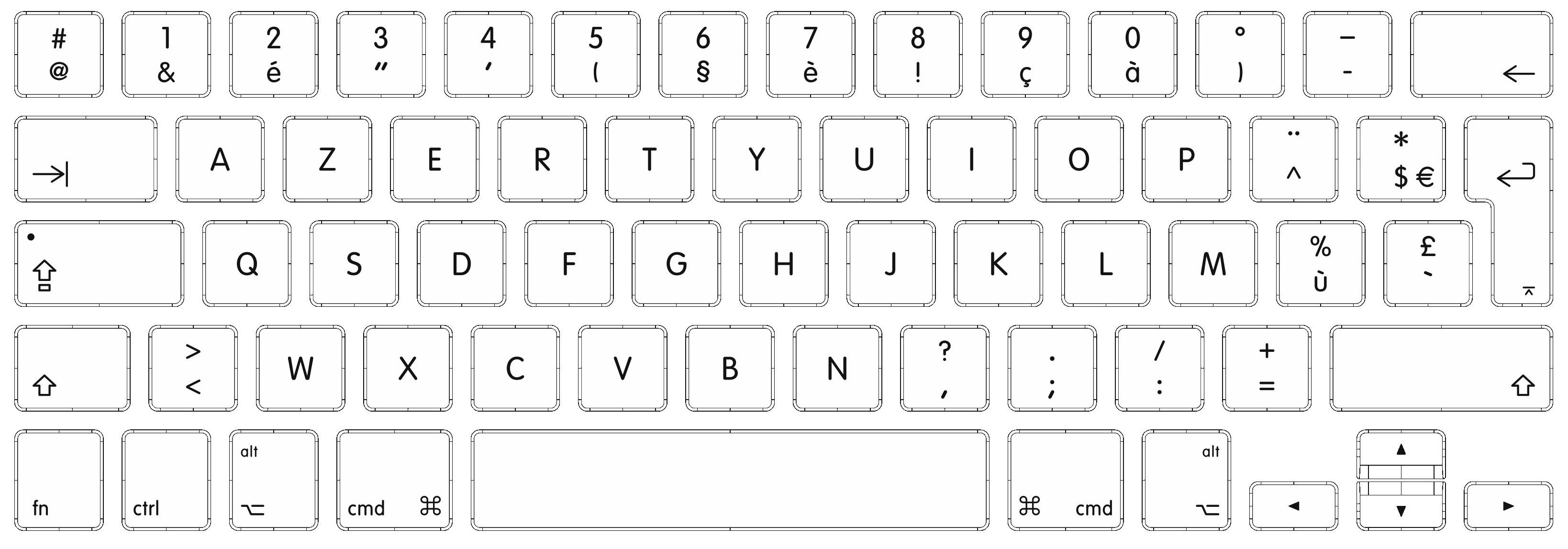
Apple French keyboard layout

Apple's keyboards use the same AZERTY layout in both France and Belgium. Based on the Belgian version, the most notable differences are the locations for the @-sign and €-sign, among others. MacOS also supports the standard French layout for non-Apple keyboards; the standard Belgian layout, however, is available through third-party support only.

=== Arabic ===
There is an Arabic variant of the AZERTY keyboard. It is especially used in the African countries Algeria, Chad, Comoros, Djibouti, Mauritania, Morocco, Tunisia and in Arab communities in French-speaking countries to be able to type both in Arabic and in French.

=== Tamazight (Berber) ===
Tamazight (Berber) keyboard layout for Latin script

Tamazight (International) keyboard layout

The Tamazight (Latin) standards-compliant layout is optimised for a wide range of Tamazight (Berber) language variants – including Tuareg variants – rather than French, though French can still be typed quickly. It installs as "Tamazight_L" and can be used both on the French locale and with Tamazight locales.

QWERTY and QWERTZ adaptations of the layout are available for the physical keyboards used by major Amazigh (Berber) communities around the world.

Other layouts exist for closer backwards compatibility with the French layout. They are non-standards-compliant but convenient, allowing typing in Tifinagh script without switching layout:

- Tamazight (International) extends the French layout with Tamazight (Berber), and offers secondary Tifinagh script access by deadkey. It installs as "Tamazight (Agraghlan)" or "Français+" and is available from the official site of the Algerian High Council for Amazighity (HCA).
- Tamazight (International)+ is optimised for Tamazight (Berber), but retains close French compatibility and provides easy typing in Tifinagh script by Caps Lock. It installs as "Tamazight (Agraghlan)+" or "Tamazight_LF".

All the above layouts were designed by the Universal Amazigh Keyboard Project and are available from there.

=== Vietnamese ===
Old Vietnamese (Typewriter Vietnamese) keyboard layout

There is also a Vietnamese variant of the AZERTY keyboard. It was especially used in Vietnamese typewriters made until the 1980s.

=== Wolof ===
Wolof keyboards also use AZERTY and are supported by Microsoft Windows (Windows 7 and later only).

== See also ==
- QWERTY – Keyboard layout for Latin-script alphabets
- QWERTZ – Keyboard layout
- HCESAR – Portuguese keyboard layout
- JCUKEN – Keyboard layout for the Russian language
