= List of QWERTY keyboard language variants =

There are a large number of QWERTY keyboard layouts used for languages written in the Latin script. Many of these keyboards include some additional symbols of other languages, but there also exist layouts that were designed with the goal to be usable for multiple languages (see Multilingual variants). This list gives general descriptions of QWERTY keyboard variants along with details specific to certain operating systems, with emphasis on Microsoft Windows.

== Specific language variants ==
=== English ===
==== Canada ====
English-speaking Canadians have traditionally used the same keyboard layout as in the United States, unless they write French regularly. French-speaking Canadians have favoured the Canadian French (CFR) and the Canadian French ACNOR (CFA) keyboard layouts (see § French (Canada)).

==== United Kingdom ====
United Kingdom and Ireland (except Mac) keyboard layout

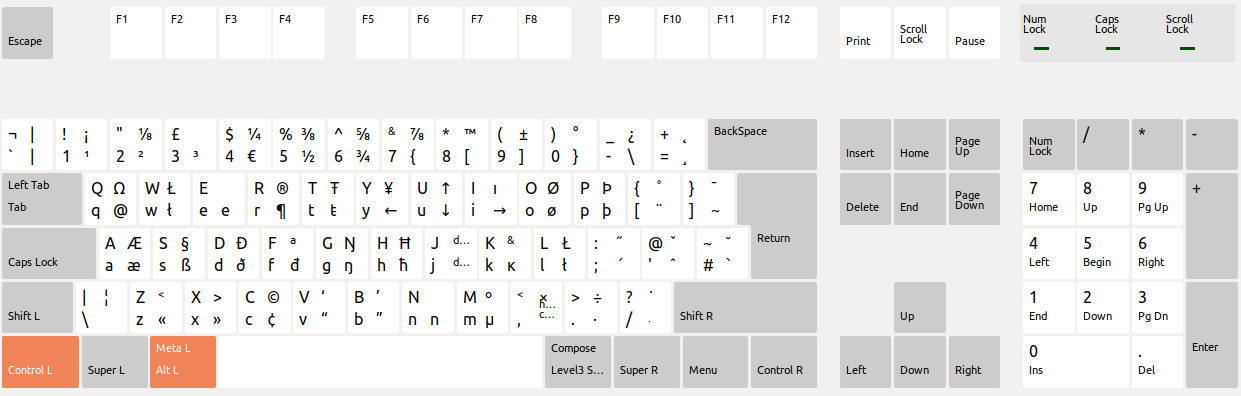
United Kingdom Keyboard layout for Linux

The United Kingdom and Ireland (Note: All common operating systems offering a different layout for Ireland actually offer a clone of the UK layout labelled "Irish" (or "Ireland"). However, there is a separate Irish Gaelic layout (called "Gaelic" or similar denominations) that, though rarely used, it also supports Scottish Gaelic. The other Insular Celtic languages have their own layout.) use a keyboard layout based on the 48-key version defined in the (now withdrawn) British Standard BS 4822. It is very similar to that of the United States, but has an AltGr key and a larger Enter key, includes £ and € signs and some rarely used EBCDIC symbols (¬, ¦), and uses different positions for the characters @, ", #, ~, \, and |.

The BS 4822:1994 standard did not make any use of the AltGr key and lacked support for any non-ASCII characters other than ¬ and £. It also assigned a key for the non-ASCII character broken bar (¦), but lacks one for the far more commonly used ASCII character vertical bar (|). It also lacked support for various diacritics used in the Welsh alphabet, and the Scottish Gaelic alphabet; and also is missing the letter yogh, ȝ, used very rarely in the Scots language. Therefore, various manufacturers have modified or extended the BS 4822 standard:

- The B00 key (left of Z), shifted, results in vertical bar (|) on some systems (e.g. Windows UK/Ireland keyboard layout and Linux/X11 UK/Ireland keyboard layout), rather than the broken bar (¦) assigned by BS 4822 and provided in some systems (e.g. IBM OS/2 UK166 keyboard layout)
- The E00 key (left of 1) with AltGr provides either vertical bar (|) (OS/2's UK166 keyboard layout, Linux/X11 UK keyboard layout) or broken bar (¦) (Windows UK/Ireland keyboard layout)

Support for the diacritics needed for Scots Gaelic and Welsh was added to Windows and ChromeOS using a "UK-extended" setting (see below); Linux and X-Windows systems have an explicit or redesignated compose key for this purpose.

===== UK Apple keyboard =====
United Kingdom version of Apple keyboard

The British version of the Apple Keyboard does not use the standard UK layout. Instead, some older versions have the US layout (see below) with a few differences: the £ sign is reached by ⇧ Shift+3 and the § sign by ⌥ Option+3, the opposite to the US layout. The € is also present and is typed with ⌥ Option+2. Umlauts are reached by typing ⌥ Option+U and then the vowel, and ß is reached by typing ⌥ Option+S.

Newer Apple "British" keyboards use a physical ISO layout.

==== United States ====
United States keyboard layout

The arrangement of the character input keys and the Shift keys contained in this layout is specified in the US national standard ANSI-INCITS 154-1988 (R1999) (formerly ANSI X3.154-1988 (R1999)), where this layout is called "ASCII keyboard". The complete US keyboard layout, as it is usually found, also contains the usual function keys in accordance with the international standard ISO/IEC 9995-2, although this is not explicitly required by the US American national standard.

US keyboards are used not only in the United States, but also in many other English-speaking jurisdictions (except the UK and Ireland) such as Canada, Australia, the Caribbean nations, Hong Kong, Malaysia, India, Pakistan, Bangladesh, Singapore, New Zealand, and South Africa. Local spelling in these regions sometimes conforms more closely to British English usage, creating the undesirable side effect of also setting the language to US English rather than the local orthography. This conflict would be fixed in Windows 8 and later versions when Microsoft separated the keyboard and language settings. US keyboards also see use in Indonesia and the Philippines, the former of which uses the same 26-letter alphabet as English.

The US keyboard layout has a second Alt key instead of the AltGr key and does not use any dead keys; this makes it inefficient for all but a handful of languages. On the other hand, the US keyboard layout (or the similar UK layout) is occasionally used by programmers in countries where the keys for []{} are located in less convenient positions on the locally customary layout.

On some keyboards the enter key is bigger than traditionally and takes up also a part of the row above, more or less the area of the traditional location of the backslash key \. In these cases the backslash is located in alternative places. It can be situated one row above the default location, on the right of the equals sign key =. Sometimes it is placed one row below its traditional place, on the right of the apostrophe key ' (in these cases the enter key is narrower than usual on the row of its default location). It may also be two rows below its default place on the right of a narrower-than-traditional right shift key.

A variant of this layout is used in Arabic-speaking countries. This variant has the | \ key to the left of Z, ~ ` key where the | \ key is in the usual layout, and the > < key where the ~ ` key is in the usual layout.

=== Czech ===
Czech QWERTY keyboard layout

The typewriter came to the Czech-speaking area in the late 19th century, when it was part of Austria-Hungary where German was the dominant language of administration. Therefore, Czech typewriters have the QWERTZ layout.

However, with the introduction of imported computers, especially since the 1990s, the QWERTY keyboard layout is frequently used for computer keyboards. The Czech QWERTY layout differs from QWERTZ in that the characters (e.g. @$& and others) missing from the Czech keyboard are accessible with AltGr on the same keys where they are located on an American keyboard. In Czech QWERTZ keyboards the positions of these characters accessed through AltGr differs. Detailed poll made on over 7,500 users showed that 41% use QWERTZ, 18% use Czech QWERTY, 12% use Czech QWERTY Programmers, 15% use US QWERTY and 13% use other keyboard layout.

=== Danish ===
Danish keyboard layout

Both the Danish and Norwegian keyboards include dedicated keys for the letters Å/å, Æ/æ and Ø/ø, but the placement is a little different, as the Æ and Ø keys are swapped on the Norwegian layout. (The Finnish–Swedish keyboard is also largely similar to the Norwegian layout, but the Ø and Æ are replaced with Ö and Ä. On some systems, the Danish keyboard may allow typing Ö/ö and Ä/ä by holding the AltGr or ⌥ Option key while striking Ø and Æ, respectively.) Computers with Windows are commonly sold with ÖØÆ and ÄÆØ printed on the two keys, allowing same computer hardware to be sold in Denmark, Finland, Norway and Sweden, with different operating system settings.

=== Dutch (Netherlands) ===
Dutch (Netherlands) keyboard layout

Though it is seldom used (most Dutch keyboards use US International layout), the Dutch layout uses QWERTY and adds the € sign, the diaeresis (◌̈), the German eszett (ß), the pilcrow (¶), the (US) cent sign (¢), the Greek letter μ (for the micro- sign), the braces ({ }) and the guillemet quotation marks (« »), as well as having different locations for some other symbols. An older version contained a single-stroke key for the Dutch digraph ij, which is usually typed by the combination of I and J. In the 1990s, there was a version with the now-obsolete florin sign (Dutch: guldenteken) for PCs.

See also § US-International in the Netherlands below.

=== Estonian ===
Estonian keyboard layout

The keyboard layout used in Estonia is virtually the same as the Swedish layout. The main difference is that the Å and ¨ keys (to the right of P) are replaced with Ü and Õ respectively (the latter letter being the most distinguishing feature of the Estonian alphabet). Some special symbols and dead keys are also moved around.

=== Faroese ===
Faroese keyboard layout

The same as the Danish layout with added Đ (Eth), since the Faroe Islands are a self-governed part of the Kingdom of Denmark.

=== French (Canada) ===
A simplified Canadian French keyboard layout.

The Canadian French 058 (CFR) keyboard layout is commonly used in Canada by French-speakers. It is the most common layout for laptops and stand-alone keyboards aimed at the Francophone market. Unlike the AZERTY layout used in France and Belgium, it is a QWERTY layout and as such is also relatively commonly used by English speakers in the US and Canada (accustomed to using US standard QWERTY keyboards) for easy access to the accented letters found in some French loanwords. It can be used to type all accented French characters, as well as some from other languages, and serves all English functions as well. It is popular mainly because of its close similarity to the basic US keyboard commonly used by English-speakers, historical use of US-made typewriters by French-Canadians. The right Alt key is an AltGr key that gives easy access to a further range of characters (marked in blue and red on the keyboard image. Blue indicates an alternative character that will display as typed. Red indicates a dead key: the diacritic will be applied to the next letter typed.) The traditional Canadian French keyboard from IBM must use an ISO keyboard. The French guillemets on the extra key are needed to type proper French; they are not optional. A Dvorak version (traditional Canadian French layout) is also supported on Linux.

In this keyboard, the key names are translated to French:

- ⇪ Caps Lock is Fix Maj or Verr Maj (short for fixer / verrouiller majuscule, meaning uppercase lock ).
- ↵ Enter is ↵ Entrée.
- Esc is Échap.

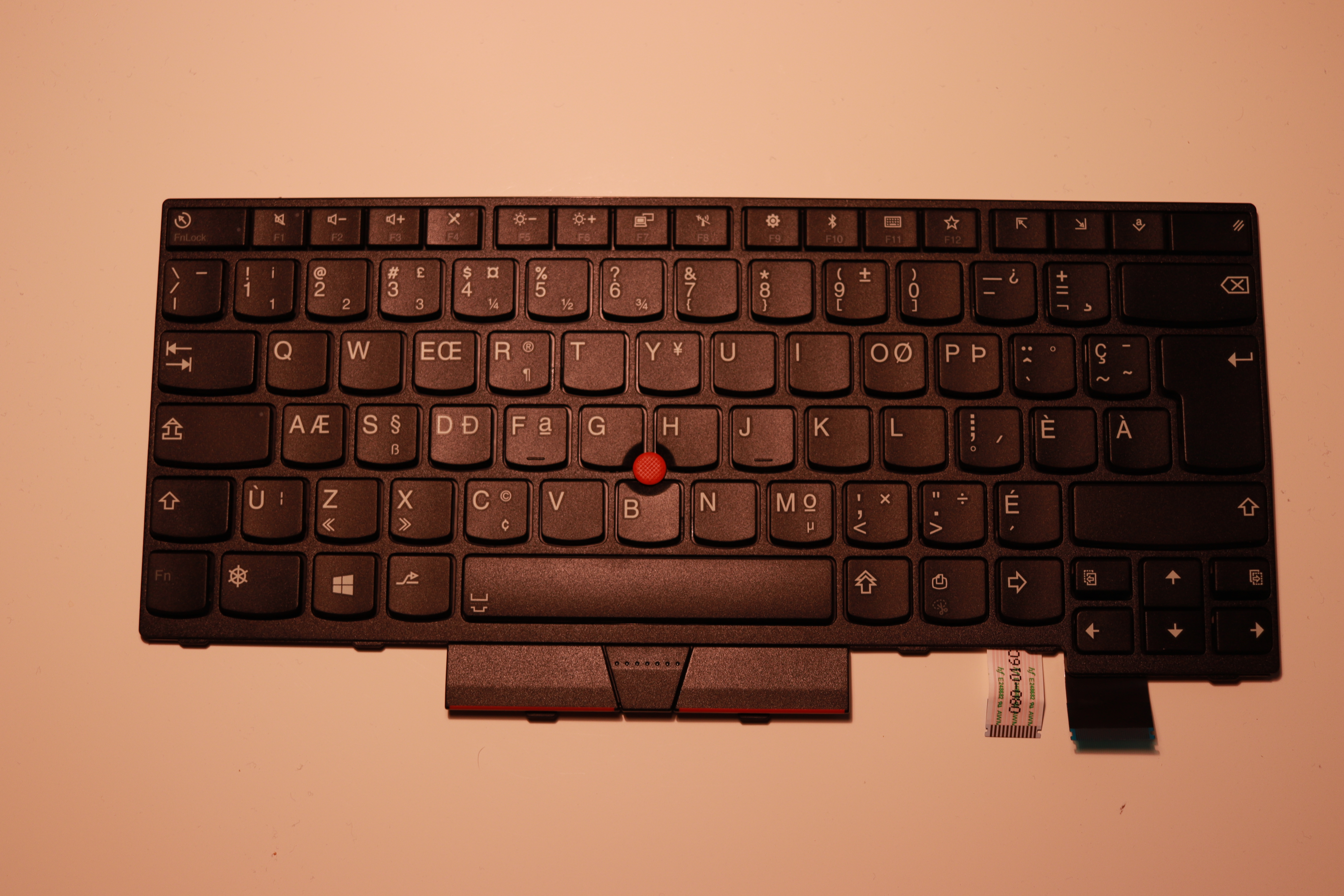
A full standardized CSA keyboard has significantly more symbols and pictograms. This layout allows typing in English, French and 12 or more other languages.

The "hybrid" keyboard layout, often referred incorrectly as "Canadian multilingual" or "bilingual" is a mix between the US English and the Canadian French layout over an ISO keyboard. This layout has been developed by manufacturers as a cost-saving strategy first for their low-end laptops. They tend to be extended to the mid-range laptops in the recent years and sold wrongly as a "French" keyboard. Today, this layout seems to be criticized by both anglophones and francophones. The anglophones accustomed to the ANSI keyboard complain about the small ISO shift on left and francophones can find these legends hard to read and messy. In this keyboard, the key names are translated in both French and English. This keyboard can be nevertheless useful for programming.

In 1988, the Quebec government developed a new keyboard layout, using distinct keys for Ù,Ç,É,È,À, standardized by the CSA Group and adopted also by the federal government. This layout is known as Canadian French (Legacy) today on Windows and is considered to be the ancestor to the current Canadian Multilingual Standard (CMS). The CMS on Microsoft Windows is based on the CAN/CSA Z243.200-92 standard (launched in 1992 by the CSA Group, revised in 2021), with a few differences. Apple use a layout based mostly on the standardized CSA keyboard from 1992 too, called Canadian ― CSA. Linux has also a layout based on the official standard called Canadian (CSA). CMS is one of the few layouts on Microsoft Windows that includes the ligature œ/Œ, common in French. The current government standard SGQRI-001 in Quebec, from 2006, based on CAN/CSA Z243.200-92, uses pictograms based on the ISO/IEC 9995-7 standard. Unlike the traditional Canadian French keyboard developed by IBM, the CSA Keyboard is also standardized on both ISO and ANSI keyboards. The French guillemets on the CSA keyboard are on level 3 ⇮AltGr of the Z and X keys. The Ù on the extra key can be replaced by a combination of ⇮AltGr+` (dead key left from Ç) then u or ⇧Shift+u. The ISO version is nevertheless mandated by the Quebec government. The CSA keyboard is also named Canadian French ACNOR (CFA) or Canadian French 445/501.

=== Greek ===
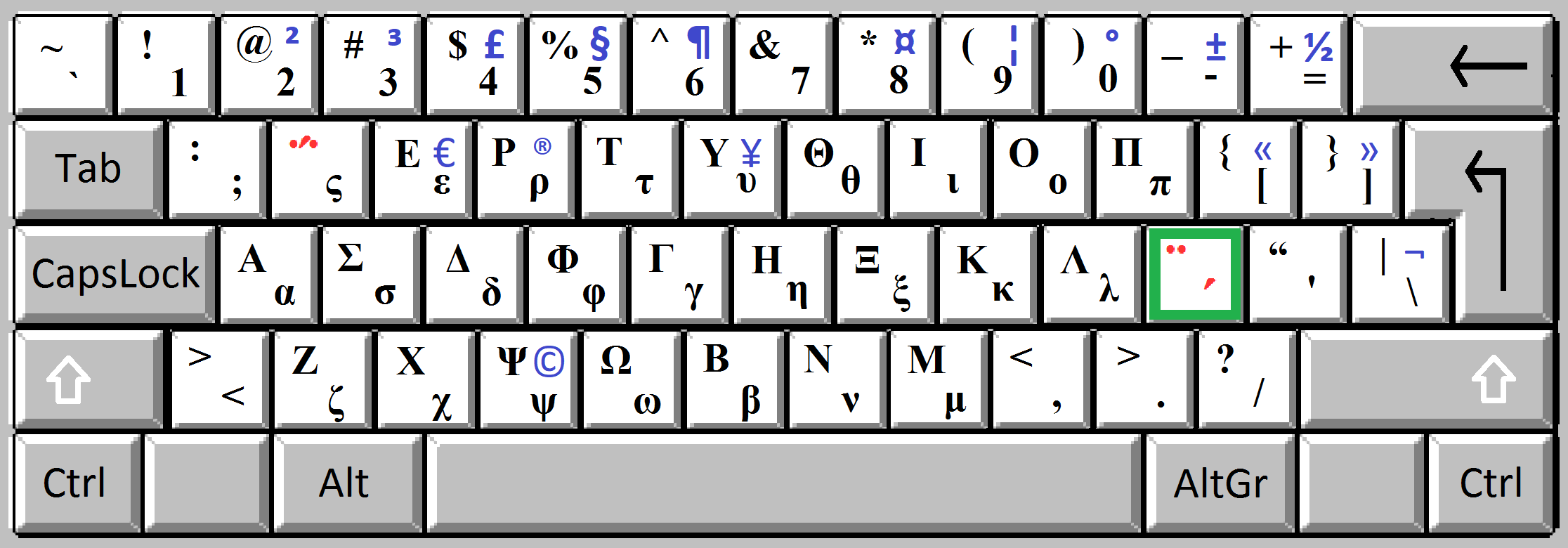
Modern Greek keyboard layout

- The stress accents, indicated in red, are produced by pressing that key (or shifted key) followed by an appropriate vowel.
- Use of the "AltGr" key may produce the characters shown in blue.

=== German ===
Germany, Austria, Switzerland, The Czech Republic, Hungary, Liechtenstein, Luxembourg and former Yugoslav countries use QWERTZ layouts, where the letter Z is to the right of T (and the Y is to the left of the X).

=== Icelandic ===
Icelandic keyboard layout

The Icelandic keyboard layout is different from the standard QWERTY keyboard because the Icelandic alphabet has some special letters, most of which it shares with the other Nordic countries: Þ/þ, Ð/ð, Æ/æ, and Ö/ö. (Æ/æ also occurs in Norwegian, Danish and Faroese, Ð/ð in Faroese, and Ö/ö in Swedish, Finnish and Estonian. In Norwegian Ö/ö could be substituted for Ø/ø which is the same sound/letter and is widely understood).

The letters Á/á, Ý/ý, Ú/ú, Í/í, Ó/ó and É/é are produced by first pressing the ´ dead key and then the corresponding letter. The Nordic letters Å/å and Ä/ä can be produced by first pressing °, located below the Esc key, and ⇧ Shift+° (for ¨) which also works for the non-Nordic ÿ, Ü/ü, Ï/ï, and Ë/ë. These letters are not used natively in Icelandic, but may have been implemented for ease of communication in other Nordic languages. Additional diacritics may be found behind the AltGr key: AltGr++ for ˋ (grave accent) and AltGr+´ for ˆ (circumflex).

=== Irish ===
Microsoft Windows Irish layout

Windows includes an Irish layout which supports acute accents with AltGr for the Irish language and grave accents with the ` dead key for Scottish Gaelic. The other Insular Celtic languages have their own layout. The UK or UK-Extended layout is also frequently used.

=== Italian ===
Italian keyboard layout

The Italian keyboard layout is the keyboard layout commonly used on computers in Italy. It is QWERTY-based and follows the ISO/IEC 9995 standard. Italian-speaking people in Switzerland on the contrary use the Swiss QWERTZ keyboard with Swiss Italian layout.

The Italian keyboard layout on Microsoft Windows lacks the uppercase letters with accents that are used in Italian language: À, È, É, Ì, Ò, and Ù. (Note: Letter O with acute (Ó, ó) is also missing in the Italian keyboard layout. Although it is not a standard letter of Italian alphabet, it is sometimes used when it is necessary to distinguish the open-mid sound from the close-mid sound (the latter being written as Ò).) As such diacritics are normally used only on word-final vowels, this deficiency is usually overcome by using normal capital letters followed by apostrophe ('), e.g. E' instead of È, although this practice is disparaged by language purists. Anyhow, most of modern word processors and text editors include autocorrection tools that change automatically the apostrophe into the correct accent when Italian language check is enabled.

On the contrary, this issue is not present under Linux, where the capital letters with accent are available by just enabling Caps Lock and pressing the corresponding lowercase accented letter.

Despite the lack of uppercase accented vowels, the Italian layout has no dead keys.

Some of the keys are usually labeled in Italian, although Italian keyboards with English labels are available as well. Keys Alt, Alt Gr, Ctrl, Ins and Tab do not change, while the following labels are in Italian language:

| Italian label | English equivalent |
|---|---|
| ⇪ Bloc Maiusc | ⇪ Caps Lock |
| Bloc Num | Num Lock |
| Bloc Scorr | Scroll Lock |
| Canc | Delete |
| Fine | End |
| Inizio or ⬉ | Home |
| ↵ Invio | ↵ Enter |
| ⇧ Maiusc | ⇧ Shift |
| Pag🠕 | Page Up |
| Pag🠗 | Page Down |
| Pausa | Pause |
| Stamp | Print Screen |

Italian keyboard layout on Windows also does not include all ASCII characters, as it lacks the backtick (`) and tilde (~). On Linux, they can be typed by pressing AltGr+⇧ Shift+' and AltGr+⇧ Shift+ì respectively.

Moreover, the layout includes the lowercase letter C with cedilla (ç) which is not used in the Italian language.

==== Old QZERTY layout ====
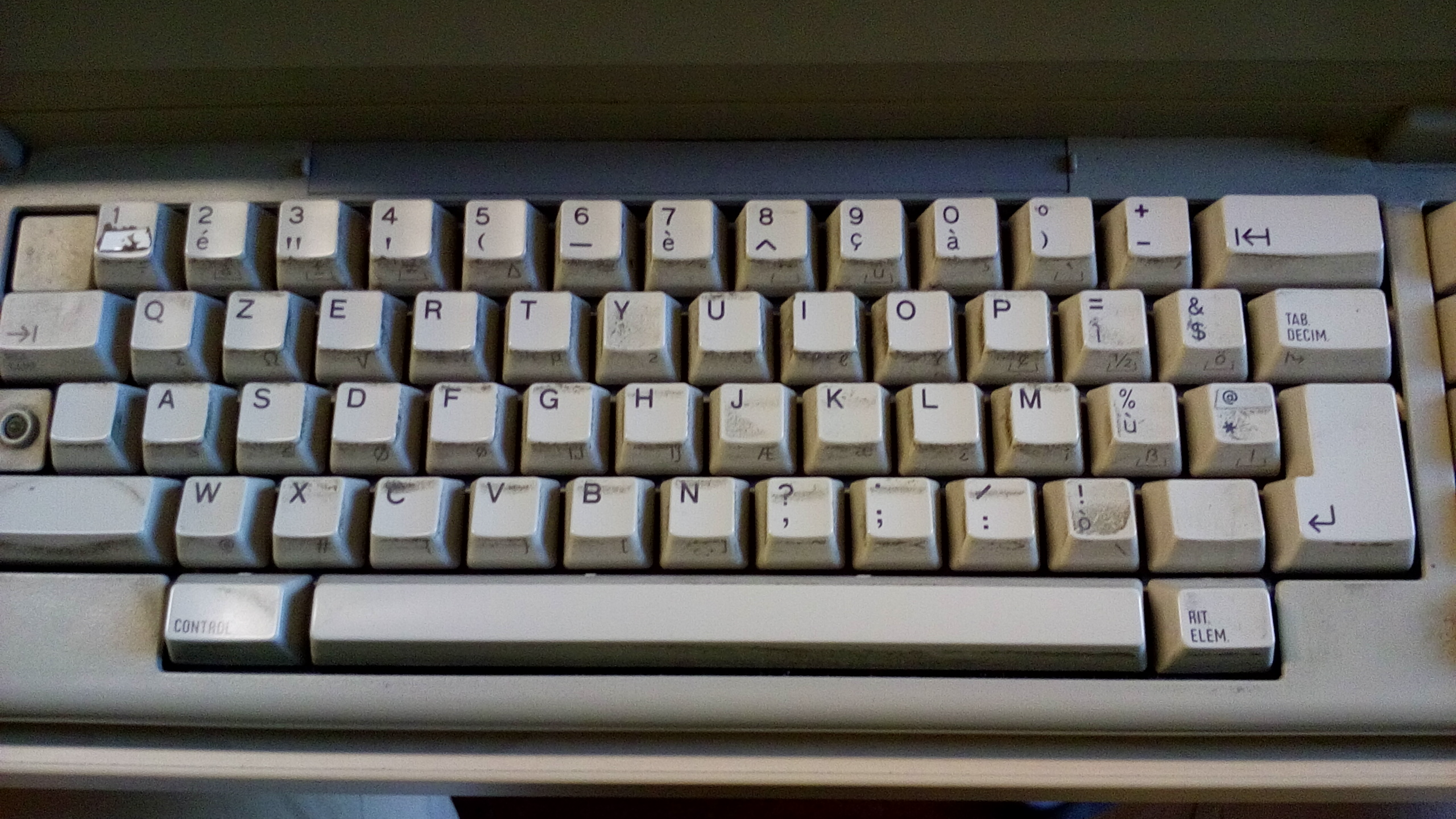
An old Italian electric typewriter with QZERTY layout

In the past, Italian typewriters and early personal computers used the QZERTY layout with some differences with respect to the current QWERTY layout:

- Z and W are swapped;
- M is moved from the right of N to the right of L;
- number keys are shifted.

Apple also supported QZERTY layout in its early Italian keyboards as well as in the iPod Touch.

=== Latvian ===
Although rarely used, a keyboard layout specifically designed for the Latvian language called ŪGJRMV exists. The Latvian QWERTY keyboard layout is most commonly used; its layout is the same as the United States one, special characters (āčēģīķļņōŗšūž) can be entered by pressing AltGr and basic letter (like in Polish and Romanian programmers layouts) or dead key. The most common dead key is the apostrophe ('), which is followed by Alt+Gr (Windows default for Latvian layout). Some prefer using the tick (`).

=== Lithuanian ===
Lithuanian QWERTY keyboard layout ("numeric")

The most common Lithuanian keyboard layout is based on the US English layout, but with the following differences:

- Numbers 1–8 on the number row, the = key, and their corresponding secondary characters are replaced with the Lithuanian letters with diacritic (ą, č, ę, ė, į, š, ų, ž and Ą, Č, Ę, Ė, Į, Š, Ų, Ū, Ž).
- Numbers and = can be entered by holding down the AltGr ("right Alt", or ⌥ Option on Mac) key. 9 and 0 can be entered with or without using AltGr.
- The other special characters (!, @, #, $, %, ^, &, * and +) can be entered by holding down AltGr and ⇧ Shift.
- The euro sign can be entered by pressing AltGr+E.

This layout is available in Windows, macOS (Tahoe and newer) and Linux. Earlier versions of macOS included a different version of the layout, in which the numbers and special characters are entered using a dead key instead.

The Windows version of the layout does not include upper/lower quotation marks („ “) and the en dash (–). However, on macOS and Linux, these characters are assigned to the 9, 0 and AltGr+- keys respectively.

An alternative layout known as ĄŽERTY is defined in the national standard LST 1582:2012. It is based on the French AZERTY layout, but with modifications to accommodate Lithuanian characters. However, it is not as popular as the "number row" layout.

=== Maltese ===
The Maltese language uses Unicode (UTF-8) to display the Maltese diacritics: ċ Ċ; ġ Ġ; ħ Ħ; ż Ż (together with à À; è È; ì Ì; ò Ò; ù Ù). There are two standard keyboard layouts for Maltese, according to "MSA 100:2002 Maltese Keyboard Standard"; one of 47 keys and one of 48 keys. The 48-key layout is the most popular.

=== Norwegian ===
Norwegian keyboard layout

Norwegian with Sámi

The Norwegian languages use the same letters as Danish, but the Norwegian keyboard differs from the Danish layout regarding the placement of the Ø, Æ and \ (backslash) keys. On the Danish keyboard, the Ø and Æ are swapped. The Swedish keyboard is also similar to the Norwegian layout, but Ø and Æ are replaced with Ö and Ä. On some systems, the Norwegian keyboard may allow typing Ö/ö and Ä/ä by holding the AltGr or ⌥ Option key while striking Ø and Æ, respectively.

There is also an alternative keyboard layout called Norwegian with Sámi, which allows for easier input of the characters required to write various Sámi languages. All the Sámi characters are accessed through the AltGr key.

On Macintosh computers, the Norwegian and Norwegian extended keyboard layouts have a slightly different placement for some of the symbols obtained with the help of the ⇧ Shift or ⌥ Option keys. Notably, the $ sign is accessed with ⇧ Shift+4 and ¢ with ⇧ Shift+⌥ Option+4. Furthermore, the frequently used @ is placed between Æ and Return.

=== Polish ===
Polish typist's keyboard (QWERTZ PN-87; known in Windows as Polish (214))

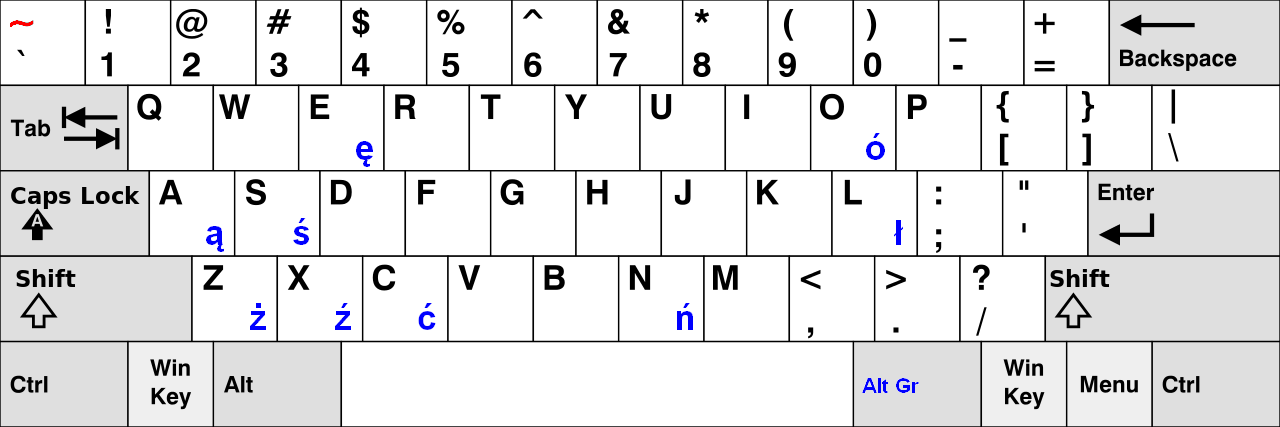
Polish programmer's keyboard

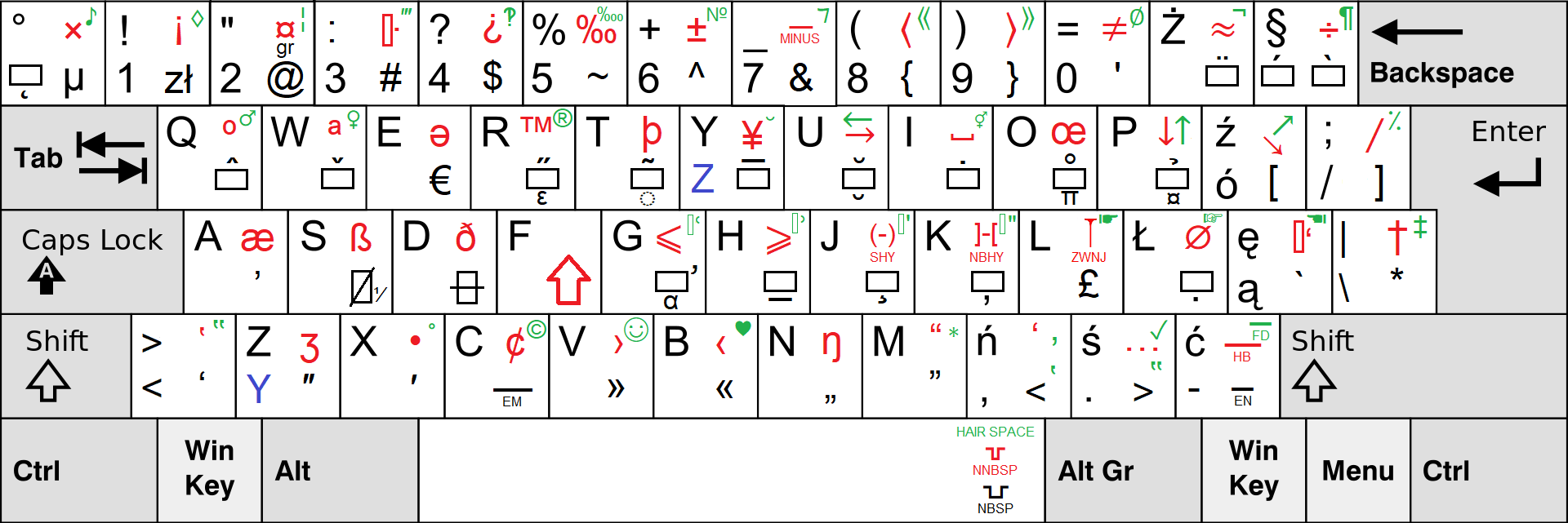
New expanded Polish keyboard layout since 2021

Most typewriters use a QWERTZ keyboard with Polish letters (with diacritical marks) accessed directly (officially approved as "Typist's keyboard", Polish: klawiatura maszynistki, Polish Standard PN-87), which is mainly ignored in Poland as impractical (custom-made keyboards, e.g., those in the public sector as well as some Apple computers, present an exception to this paradigm); the "Polish programmer's" (Polish: polski programisty) layout has become the de facto standard, used on virtually all computers sold on the Polish market.

Most computer keyboards in Poland are laid out according to the standard US visual and functional layout. Polish diacritics are accessed by using the AltGr key with a corresponding similar letter from the base Latin alphabet. Normal capitalization rules apply with respect to Shift and Caps Lock keys. For example, to enter "Ź", one can type Shift+AltGr+X with Caps Lock off, or turn on Caps Lock and type AltGr+X.

Both ANSI and ISO mechanical layouts are common sights, and even some non-standard mechanical layouts are in use. ANSI is often preferred, as the additional key provides no additional function, at least in Microsoft Windows where it duplicates the backslash key, while taking space from the Shift key. Many keyboards do not label AltGr as such, leaving the Alt marking as in the US layout – the right Alt key nevertheless functions as AltGr in this layout, causing possible confusion when keyboard shortcuts with the Alt key are required (these usually work only with the left Alt) and causing the key to be commonly referred to as right Alt (Polish: prawy Alt). However, keyboards with AltGr marking are available and it is also officially used by Microsoft when depicting the layout.

Key combinations to obtain Polish characters (Windows)
| Caps Lock state | In combination with | Keystroke | | | | | | | | | |
|---|---|---|---|---|---|---|---|---|---|---|---|
| Caps Lock state | In combination with | A | C | E | L | N | O | S | Z | X | U |
| Off | right Alt | ą | ć | ę | ł | ń | ó | ś | ż | ź | € |
| Off | Shift & right Alt | Ą | Ć | Ę | Ł | Ń | Ó | Ś | Ż | Ź | |
| On | right Alt | Ą | Ć | Ę | Ł | Ń | Ó | Ś | Ż | Ź | € |
| On | Shift & right Alt | ą | ć | ę | ł | ń | ó | ś | ż | ź | |
Note: On Polish programmer keyboard, right Alt plays the role of AltGr

Also, on MS Windows, the tilde character "~" (Shift+`) acts as a dead key to type Polish letters (with diacritical marks) thus, to obtain an "Ł", one may press Shift+` followed by L. The tilde character is obtained with (Shift+`) then space.

In X11 and Wayland-based environments (commonly used on Linux-based operating systems), the euro symbol is typically mapped to Alt+5 instead of Alt+U, the tilde acts as a regular key, and several accented letters from other European languages are accessible through combinations with left Alt. Polish letters are also accessible by using the compose key.

Software keyboards on touchscreen devices usually make the Polish diacritics available as one of the alternatives which show up after long-pressing the corresponding Latin letter. However, modern predictive text and autocorrection algorithms largely mitigate the need to type them directly on such devices.

=== Portuguese ===
==== Brazil ====
Portuguese (Brazil) keyboard layout

The Brazilian computer keyboard layout is specified in the ABNT NBR 10346 variant 2 (alphanumeric portion) and 10347 (numeric portion) standards.

Essentially, the Brazilian keyboard contains dead keys for five variants of diacritics in use in the language; the letter Ç, the only application of the cedilha in Portuguese, has its own key. In some keyboard layouts the AltGr+C combination produces the ₢ character (Unicode 0x20A2), symbol for the old currency cruzeiro, a symbol that is not used in practice (the common abbreviation in the eighties and nineties used to be Cr$). The cent sign ¢, is accessible via AltGr+5, but is not commonly used for the centavo, subunit of previous currencies as well as the current real, which itself is represented by R$. The Euro sign € is not standardized in this layout. The masculine and feminine ordinals ª and º are accessible via AltGr combinations. The section sign § (Unicode U+00A7), in Portuguese called parágrafo, is nowadays practically only used to denote sections of laws.

Variant 2 of the Brazilian keyboard, the only which gained general acceptance (MS Windows treats both variants as the same layout), has a unique mechanical layout, combining some features of the ISO 9995-3 and the JIS keyboards in order to fit 12 keys between the left and right Shift (compared to the American standard of 10 and the international of 11). Its modern, IBM PS/2-based variations, are thus known as 107-keys keyboards, and the original PS/2 variation was 104-key. Variant 1, never widely adopted, was based on the ISO 9995-2 keyboards. To make this layout usable with keyboards with only 11 keys in the last row, the rightmost key (/?°) has its functions replicated across the AltGr+Q, AltGr+W, and AltGr+E combinations.

==== Portugal ====
Portuguese (Portugal) keyboard layout

Essentially, the Portuguese keyboard contains dead keys for five variants of diacritics; the letter Ç, the only application of the cedilha in Portuguese, has its own key, but there is also a dedicated key for the ordinal indicators and a dedicated key for quotation marks. The AltGr+E combination for producing the euro sign € (Unicode 0x20AC) has become standard. On some QWERTY keyboards the key labels are translated, but the majority are labelled in English.

During the 20th century, a different keyboard layout, HCESAR, was in widespread use in Portugal.

=== Romanian ===
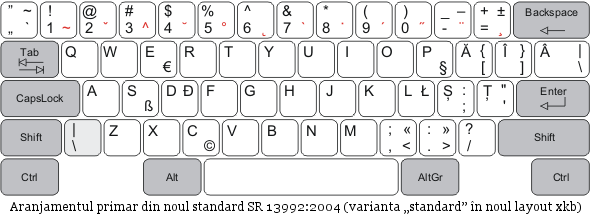
Romanian keyboard layout

The current Romanian National Standard SR 13392:2004 establishes two layouts for Romanian keyboards: a "primary" one and a "secondary" one.

The "primary" layout is intended for traditional users who have learned how to type with older, Microsoft-style implementations of the Romanian keyboard. The "secondary" layout is mainly used by programmers as it does not contradict the physical arrangement of keys on a US-style keyboard. The "secondary" arrangement is used as the default Romanian layout by Linux distributions, as defined in the "X Keyboard Configuration Database".

There are four Romanian-specific characters that are incorrectly implemented in versions of Microsoft Windows before Vista:

- Ș (U+0218, S with comma), incorrectly implemented as Ş (U+015E, S with cedilla)
- ș (U+0219, s with comma), incorrectly implemented as ş (U+015F, s with cedilla)
- Ț (U+021A, T with comma), incorrectly implemented as Ţ (U+0162, T with cedilla)
- ț (U+021B, t with comma), incorrectly implemented as ţ (U+0163, t with cedilla)

The cedilla-versions of the characters do not exist in the Romanian language (they came to be used due to a historic bug). The UCS now says that encoding this was a mistake because it messed up Romanian data and the letters with cedilla and the letters with comma are the same letter with a different style.

Since Romanian hardware keyboards are not widely available, Cristian Secară has created a driver that allows Romanian characters to be generated with a US-style keyboard in all versions of Windows prior to Vista through the use of the AltGr key modifier.

Windows Vista and newer versions include the correct diacritical signs in the default Romanian Keyboard layout.

This layout has the Z and Y keys mapped like in English layouts and also includes characters like the 'at' (@) and dollar ($) signs, among others. The older cedilla-version layout is still included albeit as the 'Legacy' layout.

=== Slovak ===
Slovak QWERTY/Z keyboard layout

In Slovakia, similarly to the Czech Republic, both QWERTZ and QWERTY keyboard layouts are used. QWERTZ is the default keyboard layout for Slovak in Microsoft Windows.

=== Spanish ===
==== Spain ====
Spanish keyboard layout

The Spanish keyboard layout is used to write in Spanish and in other languages of Spain such as Catalan, Basque, Galician, Aragonese, Asturian and Occitan. It includes Ñ for Spanish, Asturian and Galician, the acute accent, the diaeresis, the inverted question and exclamation marks (¿, ¡), the superscripted o and a (º, ª) for writing abbreviated ordinal numbers in masculine and feminine in Spanish and Galician, and finally, some characters required only for typing Catalan and Occitan, namely Ç, the grave accent and the interpunct (punt volat / punt interior, used in l·l; located at Shift-3). It can also be used to write other international characters, such as those using a circumflex accent (used in French and Portuguese among others), which are available as dead keys. However, it lacks two characters used in Asturian: Ḥ and Ḷ (historically, general support for these two has been poor – they are not present in the ISO 8859-1 character encoding standard, or any other ISO/IEC 8859 standard). Several alternative distributions, based on this one or created from scratch, have been created to address this issue (see the Other original layouts and layout design software section for more information).

On most keyboards, € is marked as Alt Gr + E and not Alt Gr + 5 as shown in the image. However, in some keyboards, € is found marked twice.

Spanish keyboards are usually labelled in Spanish instead of English, its abbreviations being:

| Spanish label | English equivalent |
|---|---|
| Intro | Enter |
| Bloq Mayús | Caps Lock |
| Impr Pant / PetSis | Print Screen / SysRq |
| Bloq Despl | Scroll Lock |
| Pausa / Inter | Pause / Break |
Insert
| Supr | Delete |
| Inicio | Home |
| Fin | End |
| Re Pág | Page Up |
| Av Pág | Page Down |
| Bloq Num | Num Lock |

On some keyboards, the c-cedilla key (Ç) is located one or two lines above, rather than on the right of, the acute accent key (´). In some cases it is placed on the right of the plus sign key (+), while in other keyboards it is situated on the right of the inverted exclamation mark key (¡).

==== Latin America, officially known as Spanish Latinamerican sort ====
Latin American Spanish keyboard layout

The Latin American Spanish keyboard layout is used throughout Mexico, Central and South America. Before its design, Latin American vendors had been selling the Spanish (Spain) layout as default; this is still being the case, with both keyboard layouts being sold simultaneously all over the region.

Its most obvious difference from the Spanish (Spain) layout is the lack of a Ç key. While it has the tilde (~), it is not a dead key on Windows (available on Linux as an option to be enabled). It also has the circunflex (^) and the grave accent (`) available as tertiary position characters on AltGr+{ and AltGr+} while in the Spanish Spain layout the grave has its own key and the diaeresis can be typed using ⇧ Shift as a secondary position character. This is not a problem when writing in Spanish but it generates issues when trying to type in other languages such as French or Portuguese, due to the inhability to produce the Ç or the unfavourable position of the other dead keys. This is specially true either for countries with large commercial ties to Brazil (Argentina, Paraguay and Uruguay) or for language learners and translators. Apart from that, the € sign is nonexistent on this layout. It has to be typed from the numeric pad using an altcode or copied and pasted from other websites.

The Latin American layout, although similar to the Spanish Spain layout, has some peculiarities: the ´ is placed next to the p, while in the Spanish Spain layout it is located next to the ñ. Meanwhile, the @ sign (done by pressing AltGr+2 in the Spain layout) is instead produced by pressing AltGr+q. These two features generate a lot of confusion on many users as many machines use a different keyboard layout that the one set as default on the system: one may encounter a computer with the Spanish Spain layout set up as default but also having the Latin American keyboard physically, or the other way around. Thus, it is very common for people to hit the wrong dead key or be unable to produce a character as shown on the layout because these two keyboards are available side by side to the public, so users generally struggle from the transition of i.e. using the Latin American distribution at home while employing the Spanish Spain layout at work or school or vice versa.

In this layout, key names are translated: "Caps Lock" is rendered as "Bloq Mayús", "Enter" appears as either "Intro" or "Entrar" depending on the vendor, "Page up" and "page down" appear as "re pág" and "av pag", respectively; "shift" is translated as "mayús", and "backspace" is "retroceso".

=== Swedish ===
Swedish Windows keyboard layout

The central characteristics of the Swedish keyboard are the three additional letters Å/å, Ä/ä, and Ö/ö. The same visual layout is also in use in Finland and Estonia, as the letters Ä/ä and Ö/ö are shared with the Swedish language, and even Å/å is needed by Swedish-speaking Finns. However, the Finnish multilingual adds new letters and punctuation to the functional layout.

The Norwegian keyboard largely resembles the Swedish layout, but the Ö and Ä are replaced with Ø and Æ. The Danish keyboard is also similar, but it has the Ø and Æ swapped. On some systems, the Swedish or Finnish keyboard may allow typing Ø/ø and Æ/æ by holding the AltGr or ⌥ Option key while striking Ö and Ä, respectively.

The Swedish with Sámi keyboard allows typing not only Ø/ø and Æ/æ, but even the letters required to write various Sámi languages. This keyboard has the same function for all the keys engraved on the regular Swedish keyboard, and the additional letters are available through the AltGr key.

On Macintosh computers, the Swedish and Swedish Pro keyboards differ somewhat from the image shown above, especially as regards the characters available using the ⇧ Shift or ⌥ Option keys. ⇧ Shift+§ (on the upper row) produces the ° sign, and ⇧ Shift+4 produces the € sign. The digit keys produce ©@£$∞§ with ⌥ Option and ¡"¥¢‰¶\{}≠ with ⌥ Option+⇧ Shift.

On Linux systems, the Swedish keyboard may also give access to additional characters as follows:

- first row: AltGr ¶¡@£$€¥{[]}\± and AltGr+⇧ Shift ¾¹²³¼¢⅝÷«»°¿¬
- second row: AltGr @ł€®þ←↓→œþ"~ and AltGr+⇧ Shift ΩŁ¢®Þ¥↑ıŒÞ°ˇ
- third row: AltGr ªßðđŋħjĸłøæ´ and AltGr+⇧ Shift º§ÐªŊĦJ&ŁØÆ×
- fourth row: AltGr |«»©""nµ¸·̣ and AltGr+⇧ Shift ¦<>©‘’Nº˛˙˙

Several of these characters function as dead keys.

=== Turkish ===
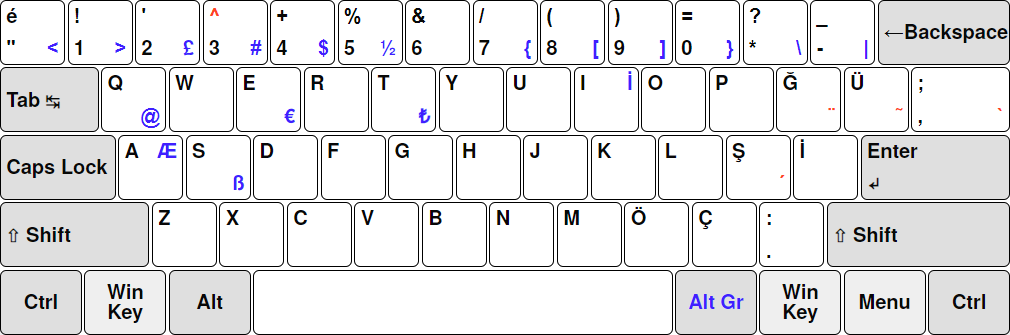
Turkish Q-keyboard layout

As of 2022, the majority of Turkish keyboards are based on QWERTY (the so-called Q-keyboard layout), although there is also the older Turkish F-keyboard layout specifically designed for the language.

=== Vietnamese ===
Vietnamese keyboard layout

The Vietnamese keyboard layout is an extended Latin QWERTY layout. The letters Ă, Â, Ê, and Ô are found on what would be the number keys 1–4 on the US English keyboard, with 5–9 producing the tonal marks (grave accent, hook, tilde, acute accent and dot below, in that order), 0 producing Đ, = producing the đồng sign (₫) when not shifted, and brackets ([]) producing Ư and Ơ.

== Multilingual variants ==
Multilingual keyboard layouts, unlike the default layouts supplied for one language and market, try to make it possible for the user to type in any of several languages using the same number of keys. Mostly this is done by adding a further virtual layer in addition to the ⇧ Shift-key by means of AltGr (or 'right Alt' reused as such), which contains a further repertoire of symbols and diacritics used by the desired languages.

This section also tries to arrange the layouts in ascending order by the number of possible languages and not chronologically according to the Latin alphabet as usual.

=== Canadian CSA Z243.200:92 ===
The Windows version may differ slightly from the official Standard in terms of the location of dead keys (midpoint ·, tilde ~) and the absence of a few characters, including đ and ⅛. The euro sign € wasn't included in the Canadian standard in 1992. Microsoft added this symbol in 1999 (4 and E keys).

The CSA keyboard layout (also named Canadian Multilingual Standard – CMS) is used by some Canadians, mostly in Quebec and New Brunswick. Though the caret (^) is missing, it is easily inserted by typing the circumflex accent followed by a space. This layout use three levels and two groups, up to 5 characters per key. Alt-Gr key is used to type a character on the level 3 ⇮AltGr and the Group 2 has a dedicated key ⇨Group 2 instead of the Right-Ctrl ⎈Ctrl.

=== United Kingdom (Extended) Layout ===
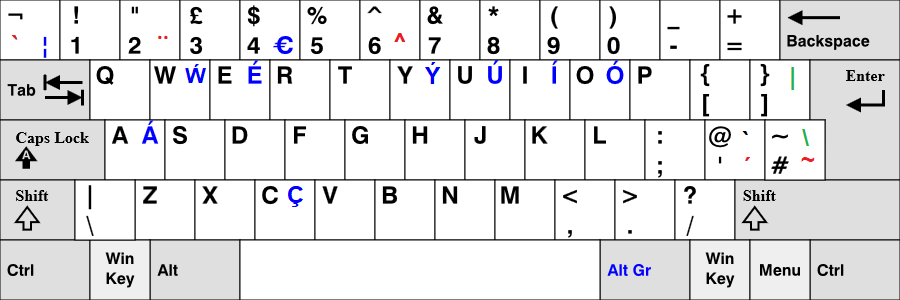
United Kingdom Extended Keyboard Layout for Windows

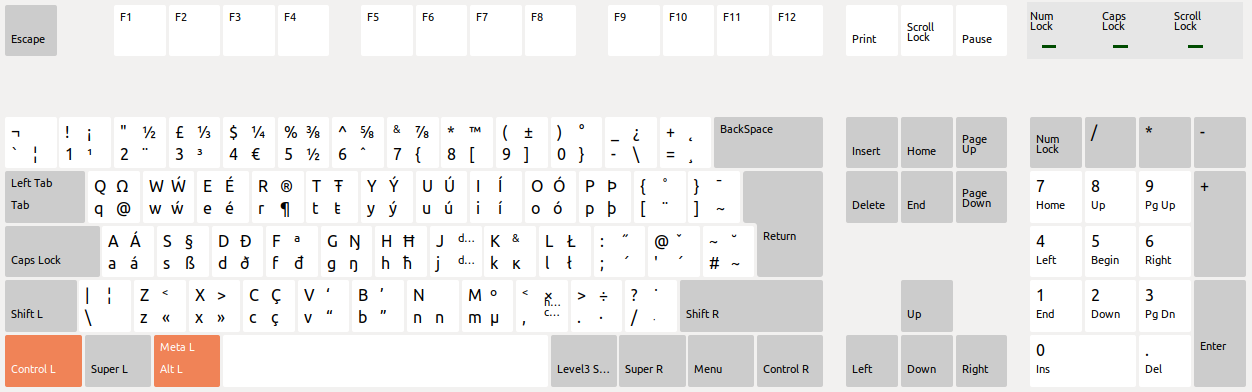
United Kingdom Extended Keyboard Layout for Linux

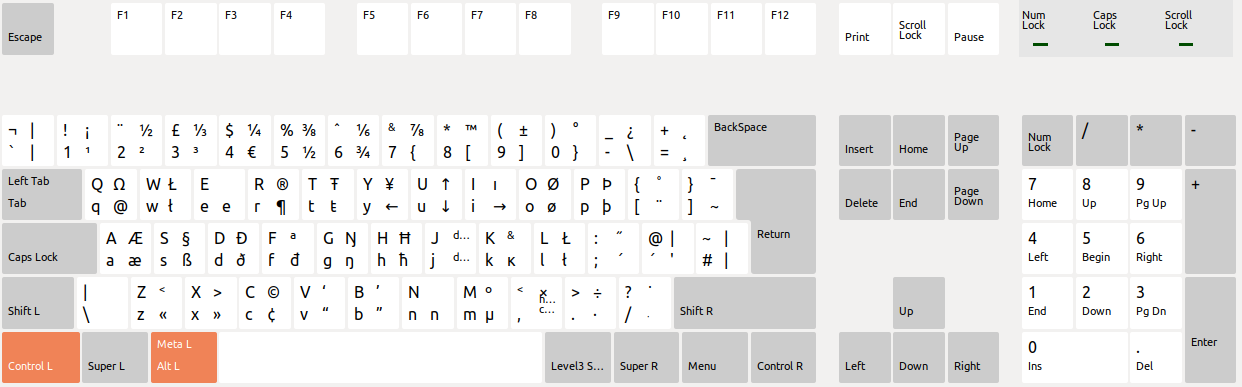
United Kingdom International Keyboard Layout for Linux

==== Windows ====
From Windows XP SP2 onwards, Microsoft has included a variant of the British QWERTY keyboard (the "United Kingdom Extended" keyboard layout) that can additionally generate several diacritical marks. This supports input on a standard physical UK keyboard for many languages without changing positions of frequently used keys, which is useful when working with text in Welsh, Scottish Gaelic and Irish — languages native to parts of the UK (Wales, parts of Scotland and Northern Ireland respectively).

In this layout, the grave accent key (`¦) becomes, as it also does in the US International layout, a dead key modifying the character generated by the next key pressed. The apostrophe, double-quote, tilde and circumflex (caret) keys are not changed, becoming dead keys only when 'shifted' with AltGr. Additional precomposed characters are also obtained by shifting the 'normal' key using the AltGr key. The extended keyboard is software installed from the Windows control panel, and the extended characters are not normally engraved on keyboards.

The UK Extended keyboard uses mostly the AltGr key to add diacritics to the letters a, e, i, n, o, u, w and y (the last two being used in Welsh) as appropriate for each character, as well as to their capitals. Pressing the key and then a character that does not take the specific diacritic produces the behaviour of a standard keyboard. The key presses followed by spacebar generate a stand-alone mark.:

- grave accents (e.g. à, è, etc.) needed for Scots Gaelic are generated by pressing the grave accent (or 'backtick') key `, which is a dead key, then the letter. Thus `+a produces à.
- acute accents (e.g. á) needed for Irish are generated by pressing the AltGr key together with the letter (or AltGr+' – acting as a dead key combination – followed by the letter). Thus AltGr+a produces á; AltGr+⇧ Shift+a produces Á. (Some programs use the combination of AltGr and a letter for other functions, in which case the AltGr+' method must be used to generate acute accents).
- the circumflex diacritic needed for Welsh may be added by AltGr+6, acting as a dead key combination, followed by the letter. Thus AltGr+6 then a produces â, AltGr+6 then w produces the letter ŵ.

Some other languages commonly studied in the UK and Ireland are also supported to some extent:

- diaeresis or umlaut (e.g. ä, ë, ö, etc.) is generated by a dead key combination AltGr+2, then the letter. Thus AltGr+2a produces ä.
- tilde (e.g. ã, ñ, õ, etc., as used in Spanish and Portuguese) is generated by dead key combination AltGr+#, then the letter. Thus AltGr+#a produces ã.
- cedilla (e.g. ç) under c is generated by AltGr+C, and the capital letter (Ç) is produced by AltGr+⇧ Shift+C

The AltGr and letter method used for acutes and cedillas does not work for applications which assign shortcut menu functions to these key combinations.

These combinations are intended to be mnemonic and designed to be easy to remember: the circumflex accent (e.g. â) is similar to the free-standing circumflex (caret) (^), printed above the 6 key; the diaeresis/umlaut (e.g. ö) is visually similar to the double-quote (") above 2 on the UK keyboard; the tilde (~) is printed on the same key as the #.

The UK Extended layout is almost entirely transparent to users familiar with the UK layout. A machine with the extended layout behaves exactly as with the standard UK, except for the rarely used grave accent key. This makes this layout suitable for a machine for shared or public use by a user population in which some use the extended functions.

Despite being created for multilingual users, UK-Extended in Windows does have some gaps — there are many languages that it cannot cope with, including Romanian and Turkish, and all languages with different character sets, such as Greek and Russian. It also does not cater for thorn (þ, Þ) in Old English, the ß in German, the œ in French, nor for the å, æ, ø, ð, þ in Nordic languages.

==== ChromeOS ====
The UK Extended layout in ChromeOS provides all the same combinations as with Windows, but adds many more symbols and dead keys via AltGr.

| ¬ ◌ ◌ ¦ | ! ¡ 1 ¹ | " ½ 2 ◌ | £ ⅓ 3 ³ | $ ¼ 4 € | % ⅜ 5 ½ | ^ ⅝ 6 ◌ | & ⅞ 7 { | * ™ 8 [ | ( ± 9 ] | ) ° 0 } | _ ¿: \ | + ◌ = ◌ |
| tab | Q Ω q @ | W Ẃ w ẃ | E É e é | R ® r ¶ | T Ŧ t ŧ | Y Ý y ý | U Ú u ú | I Í i í | O Ó o ó | P Þ p þ | { ◌ [ ◌ | } ◌ ] ◌ |
| 🔍 | A Á a á | S § s ß | D Ð d ð | F ª f đ | G Ŋ g ŋ | H Ħ h ħ | J ◌ j ◌ | K & k ĸ | L Ł l ł | : ◌; ◌ | @ ◌ ' ◌ | ~ ◌ # ◌ |
| shift | | ¦ \ | | Z < z « | X > x » | C Ç c ç | V ‘ v “ | B ’ b ” | N N n n | M º m µ | < ×, ─ | > ÷. · | ? ◌ / ◌ | shift |

Notes: Dotted circle (◌) is used here to indicate a dead key. The ` key is the only one that acts as a free-standing dead key and thus does not respond as shown on the key-cap. All others are invoked by AltGr.
AltGr+⇧ Shift+0 (°) is a degree sign; AltGr+⇧ Shift+M (º) is a masculine ordinal indicator

- Dead keys
  - `+letter produces grave accents (e.g., à/À) (`+` produces a standalone grave sign).
  - AltGr+2(release)letter produces diaeresis accents (e.g., ä/Ä)
  - AltGr+6(release)letter produces circumflex accents (e.g., â/Â)
  - AltGr+= (release) letter produces (mainly) comma diacritic or cedilla below the letter e.g., ş/Ş
  - AltGr+⇧ Shift+= (release) letter produces a hook (diacritic) on vowels (e.g., ą/Ą)
  - AltGr+[ same as AltGr+2
  - AltGr+] same as AltGr+#
  - AltGr+{(release)letter produces overrings (e.g., å/Å)
  - AltGr+}(release)letter produces macrons (e.g., ā/Ā)
  - AltGr+j(release)letter produces mainly horn (diacritic)s (e.g., ả/Ả)
  - AltGr+⇧ Shift+j(release)letter produces an adjacent horn (e.g., ư/Ư)
  - AltGr+;(release)letter produces acute accents (e.g., ź/Ź)
  - AltGr+⇧ Shift+;(release)letter produces double acute accents on some letters (e.g., Ő/ő) that exist in Unicode as pre-composed characters
  - AltGr+'(release)letter produces acute accents (e.g., á/Á)
  - AltGr+⇧ Shift+'(release)letter produces caron (haček) diacritics (e.g., ǎ/Ǎ)
  - AltGr+#(release)letter produces tilde diacritics (e.g., ã/Ã)
  - AltGr+⇧ Shift+#(release)letter produces inverted breve diacritics (e.g., ă/Ă)
  - AltGr+/(release)letter produces mainly underdots (e.g., ạ/Ạ)
  - AltGr+⇧ Shift+/(release)letter produces mainly overdots (e.g., ȧ/Ȧ)

Finally, any arbitrary Unicode glyph can be produced given its hexadecimal code point: ctrl+⇧ Shift+u, release, then the hex value, then space bar or ↩ Return. For example ctrl+⇧ Shift+u (release) 1234space produces the Ethiopic syllable SEE, ሴ.

=== US-International ===
==== Windows and Linux ====
US-International keyboard layout (Windows)

An alternative layout uses the physical US keyboard to type diacritics in some operating systems (including Windows). This is the US-International layout setting, which uses the right Alt key as an AltGr key to support many additional characters directly as an additional shift key. (Since many smaller keyboards do not have a right-Alt key, Windows also allows Ctrl+Alt to be used as a substitute for AltGr.) This layout also uses keys ', `, ", ^ and ~ as dead keys to generate characters with diacritics by pressing the appropriate key, then the letter on the keyboard. The international keyboard is a software setting installed from the Windows control panel or similar; the additional functions (shown in blue) may or may not be engraved on the keyboard, but are always functional. It can be used to type most major languages from Western Europe: Afrikaans, Danish, Dutch, English, Faroese, Finnish, French, German, Icelandic, Irish, Italian, Norwegian, Portuguese, Scottish Gaelic, Spanish, Swedish and Turkish. On Windows, it is not sufficient for French because it lacks the grapheme "œ/Œ" (as does every keyboard layout provided by Windows except the Canadian multilingual standard keyboard). Some less common western and central European languages (such as Welsh, Maltese, Czech, Finnish, Estonian and Hungarian), are not fully supported by the US-International keyboard layout because of their use of additional diacritics or precomposed characters.

A diacritic key is activated by pressing and releasing it, then pressing the letter that requires the diacritic. After the two strokes, the single character with diacritics is generated. Note that only certain letters, such as vowels and "n", can have diacritics in this way.

To generate an accented character with one of the diacritics ◌́, ◌̀, ◌̂, ◌̈ and ◌̃, press the relevant accent key then the character to be accented. Characters with diacritics can be typed with the following combinations:

- ' + vowel → vowel with acute accent, e.g., '+e → é
- ` + vowel → vowel with grave accent, e.g., `+e → è
- " + vowel → vowel with diaeresis (or umlaut), e.g., "+e → ë
- ^ + vowel → vowel with circumflex accent, e.g., ^+e → ê
- ~ + a, n or o → letter with tilde, e.g. ~+n → ñ, ~+o → õ
- ' + c → ç (Windows) or ć (X11)
- , + c → ç (X11)

The US-International layout is not entirely transparent to users familiar with the conventional US layout; when using a machine with the international layout setting active, the commonly used single- and double-quote keys and the less commonly used grave accent, tilde, and circumflex (caret) keys are dead keys and thus behave unconventionally. This could be disconcerting on a machine for shared or public use.

There are also alternative US-International mappings, whereby modifier keys such as shift and alt are used, and the keys for the characters with diacritics are in different places from their unmodified counterparts. For example, the right-Alt key may be remapped as an AltGr modifier key or as a compose key and the dead key function deactivated, so that they (the ASCII quotation marks and circumflex symbol) can be typed normally with a single keystroke.

==== US-International in the Netherlands ====
The standard keyboard layout in the Netherlands is the US ANSI-standard QWERTY keyboard, with Windows supplementary keys. The standard keyboard mapping used is US-International, as it provides easy access to the diacritics used in Dutch. The Dutch layout is historical, and keyboards with this layout are rarely used unlike in the past when typewriters were ubiquitous. The US-style keyboards sold in the Netherlands do not have the extra US-International characters or AltGr engraved on the keys, although the euro symbol (€) (AltGr+5) always is. Using this layout, the right-hand alt key functions as an AltGr key.

==== Apple International English Keyboard ====
International English version of Apple keyboard

There are three kinds of Apple Keyboards for English: the United States, the United Kingdom and International English. The International English version features the same changes as the United Kingdom version, only without substituting # for the £ symbol on ⇧ Shift+3, and as well lacking visual indication for the € symbol on ⌥ Option+2 (although this shortcut is present with all Apple QWERTY layouts).

Differences from the US layout are:

1. The ^{~}_{`} key is located on the left of the Z key, and the ^{|}_{\} key is located on the right of the ^{"}_{'} key.
2. The ^{±}_{§} key is added on the left of the ^{!}_{1} key.
3. The left ⇧ Shift key is shortened and the Return key has the shape of inverted L.

=== Finnish multilingual ===
Finnish multilingual keyboard layout

The visual layout used in Finland is basically the same as the Swedish layout. This is practical, as Finnish and Swedish share the special characters Ä/ä and Ö/ö, and while the Swedish Å/å is unnecessary for writing Finnish, it is needed by Swedish-speaking Finns and to write Swedish family names which are common. However, it lacks the letters Š/š and Ž/ž which are used in some Finnish loanwords like šaahi 'shah' and džonkki 'junk'.

As of 2008, there is a new standard for the Finnish multilingual keyboard layout, developed as part of a localization project by CSC. All the engravings of the traditional Finnish–Swedish visual layout have been retained, so there is no need to change the hardware, but the functionality has been extended considerably, as additional characters (e.g., Æ/æ, Ə/ə, Ʒ/ʒ) are available through the AltGr key, as well as dead keys, which allow typing a wide variety of letters with diacritics (e.g., Ç/ç, Ǥ/ǥ, Ǯ/ǯ).

Based on the Latin letter repertory included in the Multilingual European Subset No. 2 (MES-2) of the Unicode standard, the layout has three main objectives. First, it provides for easy entering of text in both Finnish and Swedish, the two official languages of Finland, using the familiar keyboard layout but adding some advanced punctuation options, such as dashes, typographical quotation marks, and the non-breaking space (NBSP).

Second, it is designed to offer an indirect but intuitive way to enter the special letters and diacritics needed by the other three Nordic national languages (Danish, Norwegian and Icelandic) as well as the regional and minority languages (Northern Sámi, Southern Sámi, Lule Sámi, Inari Sámi, Skolt Sámi, Romani language as spoken in Finland, Faroese, Kalaallisut also known as Greenlandic, and German).

As a third objective, it allows for relatively easy entering of particularly names (of persons, places or products) in a variety of European languages using a more or less extended Latin alphabet, such as the official languages of the European Union (excluding Bulgarian and Greek). Some letters, like Ł/ł needed for Slavic languages, are accessed by a special "overstrike" key combination acting like a dead key. However, the Romanian letters Ș/ș and Ț/ț (S/s and T/t with comma below) are not supported; the presumption is that Ş/ş and Ţ/ţ (with cedilla) suffice as surrogates.

=== EurKEY ===
EurKEY keyboard layout

EurKEY, a multilingual keyboard layout which is intended for Europeans, programmers and translators uses true QWERTY (US layout) as base just adding a third and fourth layer available through the AltGr key and AltGr+⇧ Shift. These additional layers allows the users to type the symbolism of many European languages, special characters, the Greek alphabet (via dead keys), and many common mathematical symbols.

Unlike most of the other QWERTY layouts which are standards for a country or region, EurKEY is not a standard of the European Union, yet that is why a petition of EurKEY as European standard was started.

To address the ergonomics issue of QWERTY, EurKEY Colemak-DH was also developed a Colmak-DH version with the EurKEY design principals.

== See also ==
- Dvorak Simplified Keyboard, designed for Brazilian Portuguese
