= BÉPO =

Keyboard layout for the French language

The BÉPO layout is an optimized French keyboard layout developed by the BÉPO community, supporting all Latin-based alphabets of the European Union, Greek, and Esperanto. It is also designed to ease programming. It is based on ideas from the Dvorak and other ergonomic layouts. Typing with it is usually easier due to the high frequency keys being in the home row. Typing tutors exist to ease the transition.

In 2017, the BÉPO layout was the object of an ongoing standardization by the French organization for standardization (AFNOR), along with an improved version of the traditional AZERTY layout. However, the use of the BÉPO layout, as well as that of the proposed new AZERTY layout, remained marginal.

On April 2, 2019, the standard was published by AFNOR along with the improved AZERTY keyboard.

BÉPO layout (v1.0, legacy)

BÉPO layout (NF Z71-300 norm/v1.1)
