= Turkish F-keyboard =

Turkish language customised keyboard layout

Turkish F-keyboard layout

The Turkish F-keyboard is a keyboard layout, customised for the Turkish language. Despite the greater efficiency of the Turkish F-keyboard, however, the modified QWERTY keyboard ("Q-keyboard") is the one that is used on most computers in Turkey.

The Turkish language uses the Turkish alphabet, and a dedicated keyboard layout was designed in 1955 under the leadership of İhsan Sıtkı Yener. During its development, letter frequencies in the Turkish language were investigated with the aid of Turkish Language Association. A significant feature of the F-keyboard is its organization based on letter frequency in Turkish words. For instance, the most frequently used consonant at that time, "K," is positioned under the right index finger, while the most common vowel, "A," is placed under the left index finger. This arrangement enhances accessibility to the most used letters, thus improving typing speed and ergonomics. Moreover, the least frequently used letter in Turkish, "J," is assigned to the weakest finger on the left hand, the little finger. In contrast, on the QWERTY keyboard (even in the modified Turkish QWERTY layout), the "J" key occupies a central position, which is more valuable for frequently used letters. This positioning on QWERTY keyboards thus reduces efficiency when typing in Turkish.

The basis for these specific placements and adjustments lies in a comprehensive study conducted in 1956 with contributions from the Turkish Language Association. In this study, a total of 29,934 Turkish words were analyzed, and the frequency of each letter was meticulously calculated. A detailed table published in the December 1956 issue of Sekreter Daktilograf magazine provided insights into letter frequencies in Turkish, which were then used to guide the ergonomic layout of the F-keyboard.

These statistics were then combined with studies on bone and muscle anatomy of the fingers to design the Turkish F-keyboard (Turkish: F klavye). The keyboard provides a balanced distribution of typing effort between the hands: 49% for the left hand and 51% for the right.

One unique characteristic of the Turkish language is that, due to its phonetic structure, no more than two consecutive consonants appear together within a word (i.e. Cennet). This feature was carefully considered during the design of the F-keyboard. To optimize typing flow and make it more natural, all vowel keys were strategically placed on the left hand side of the keyboard. This arrangement allows proficient Turkish typists to use an alternating rhythm between the hands, enhancing typing efficiency and comfort for typing Turkish words.

== Linguistic and ergonomic considerations ==
The 1956 Turkish F keyboard layout was designed specifically with the linguistic features and letter frequencies of the Turkish language and the ergonomic requirements of the human hand in mind. This layout emphasizes balanced typing between the right and left hands, promoting a rhythm that leverages alternating hands for smoother, more efficient typing. The placement of letters reflects both the frequency of use in Turkish and an understanding of hand anatomy, ensuring that the most frequently used letters are placed in the most accessible positions.

In the F keyboard, letters are distributed across the top, middle, and bottom rows with a focus on balancing load distribution:

- Top row frequency weight total: ~24.04% Calculated based on the designated letters in the top row.
- Middle row frequency weight total: ~63.77% Calculated with primary letters located in the middle row, providing maximum accessibility.
- Bottom row frequency weight total: ~12.21% Letters in the bottom row, adjusted for lower frequency but accessible as needed.

The distribution also considers each hand's typing load:

- Left hand frequency weight total: ~48.97% The sum of letter frequencies assigned to the left hand.
- Right hand frequency weight total: ~51.05% The sum of letter frequencies assigned to the right hand.

Based on the analysis of the Turkish Language Association's 1956 orthographic guide, we present the letter frequencies in Turkish words of the time. Below, the tables show the vowel and consonant frequencies from high to low.

Vowel frequencies with counts (descending)
Vowel	Count	Frequency (%)
A	26323	14.34
E	16308	8.88
İ	13384	7.29
I	7579	4.13
U	4952	2.70
Ü	4526	2.46
O	3635	1.98
Ö	916	0.50
Total vowel count: 77623

Consonant frequencies with counts (descending)
Consonant	Count	Frequency (%)
K	13542	7.38
M	11263	6.13
L	10496	5.72
T	9669	5.27
R	8698	4.74
N	8206	4.47
S	7929	4.32
D	4532	2.47
Y	3773	2.05
B	3703	2.02
H	3577	1.95
Z	3083	1.68
Ş	2851	1.55
P	2379	1.30
C	2300	1.25
F	2251	1.23
V	2236	1.22
Ç	2104	1.15
G	2042	1.11
Ğ	1214	0.66
J	125	0.07
Total consonant count: 105973

General total count: 183596

With this scientific preparation, Turkey has broken 14 world records in typewriting championships between 1957 and 1995. In 2009, Recep Ertaş and in 2011, Hakan Kurt from Turkey came in first in the text production event of the 47th (Beijing) and 48th (Paris) Intersteno congresses respectively.

Despite the greater efficiency of the Turkish F-keyboard however, the modified QWERTY keyboard ("Q-keyboard") is the one that is used on most computers in Turkey. The reason for the prevalence of the Turkish QWERTY keyboard over the F-keyboard was rooted in changes starting in the late 1980s. Until the 1990s, it was legally required that all typewriters imported into Turkey used the standard F-keyboard layout, and customs regulations strictly enforced this standard. However, as personal computers (PCs) began to proliferate and manufacturers sold their products equipped with the American QWERTY keyboard, obtaining a Turkish F-keyboard layout for these new computers was nearly impossible. To accommodate the influx of PCs, authorities eventually interpreted the existing F-keyboard regulation as applying only to typewriters, thus exempting computers from the mandate. This interpretation, while erroneous and aimed at facilitating imports, led to widespread adoption of the American QWERTY layout in Turkey.

In fact, the first imported keyboards lacked the unique Turkish letters (Ğ, Ş, Ç, İ, ı, Ü, Ö), and users could only type these characters through software solutions, often adding stickers on the keys to reflect the modified characters.

Interestingly, at that time, Apple was the only manufacturer adhering to Turkish regulations by providing F-keyboards on computers sold in Turkey. However, as Turkish PC users grew accustomed to the QWERTY layout, Apple later adjusted its offerings, importing devices with the Turkish QWERTY layout as the default while offering the F-keyboard as an option for those who preferred it.
