= HCESAR =

Portuguese keyboard layout

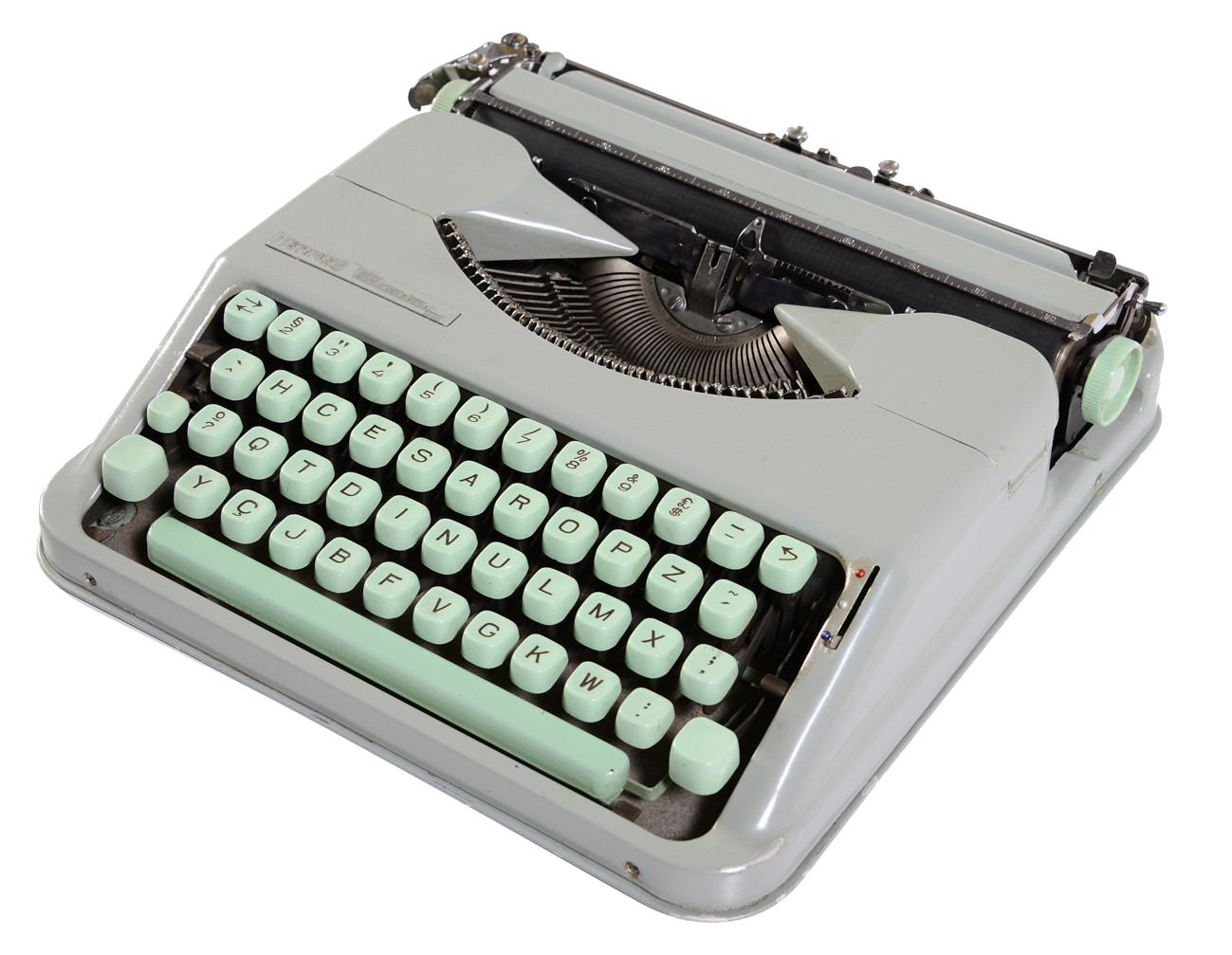
HCESAR typewriter

HCESAR keyboard layout

HCESAR ([ɐˈɣa ˈsɛzaɾ]) is a Portuguese typewriter keyboard layout that takes its name from the first six letters on the first row of alphabetical keys: H C E S A R. Created by decree of the Estado Novo regime on July 17, 1937, the layout placed the most frequently used keys in Portuguese in the center of the layout. The keys for vowels are positioned according to an inverted vowel diagram.

It was common for the 0 numeral to be omitted (in favour of using the uppercase O letter), and there were also some typewriters without the 1 numeral (with the lowercase L being used to replace it). Also missing were symbols such as the exclamation mark (achieved by typing an apostrophe and overwriting it with a period using the backspace key), the asterisk (achieved in a similar way, with lowercase X and the plus or minus sign — for eight- or six-pointed asterisks, respectively), the number sign (which was achieved by some through intricate methods involving partial strokes of the backspace key to overwrite the equals sign with two slashes), and the inequality sign (typing an equals sign and overwriting it with a single slash).

This keyboard layout was the official layout of typewriters in public administration and in most private companies until the mid-70s, when it began to be replaced by the AZERTY layout.

When both layouts were in use, HCESAR was called teclado nacional (national keyboard) and AZERTY teclado internacional (international keyboard).

In the early 1980s, when the Portuguese public administration started to replace its old machines with multiuser terminal-based computers, mainly with the Unix OS, both HCESAR and AZERTY were slowly replaced by the QWERTY layout adapted to their language.

Vintage HCESAR machines have subsequently become rare collectables.
