= QWERTZ =

Keyboard layout

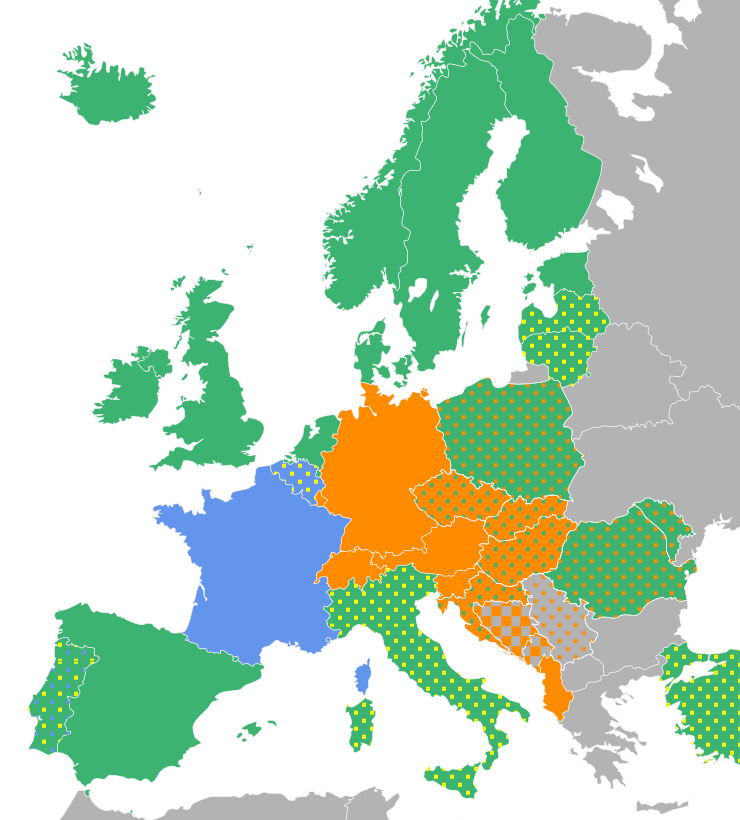
Geographic distribution of keyboards in Europe: QWERTY QWERTZ AZERTY National layout (Turkey FGGIOD, Latvia ŪGJRMV, Lithuania ĄŽERTY, Portuguese HCESAR, Italian QZERTY) Non-Latin alphabet

The QWERTZ (/ˈkwɜːrts/ KWURTS, German: /ˈkvɜːrts/ KVERTS), QWERTZU (/ˈkwɜːrtsuː/ KWURT-soo, KWURTS, German: /ˈkvɜːrˌtzu/ KVERTZU), or QWERTZUIOP keyboard is a typewriter and keyboard layout widely used in Central and Southeast Europe. The name comes from the first six letters at the top left of the keyboard: (Q W E R T Z).

== Overview ==
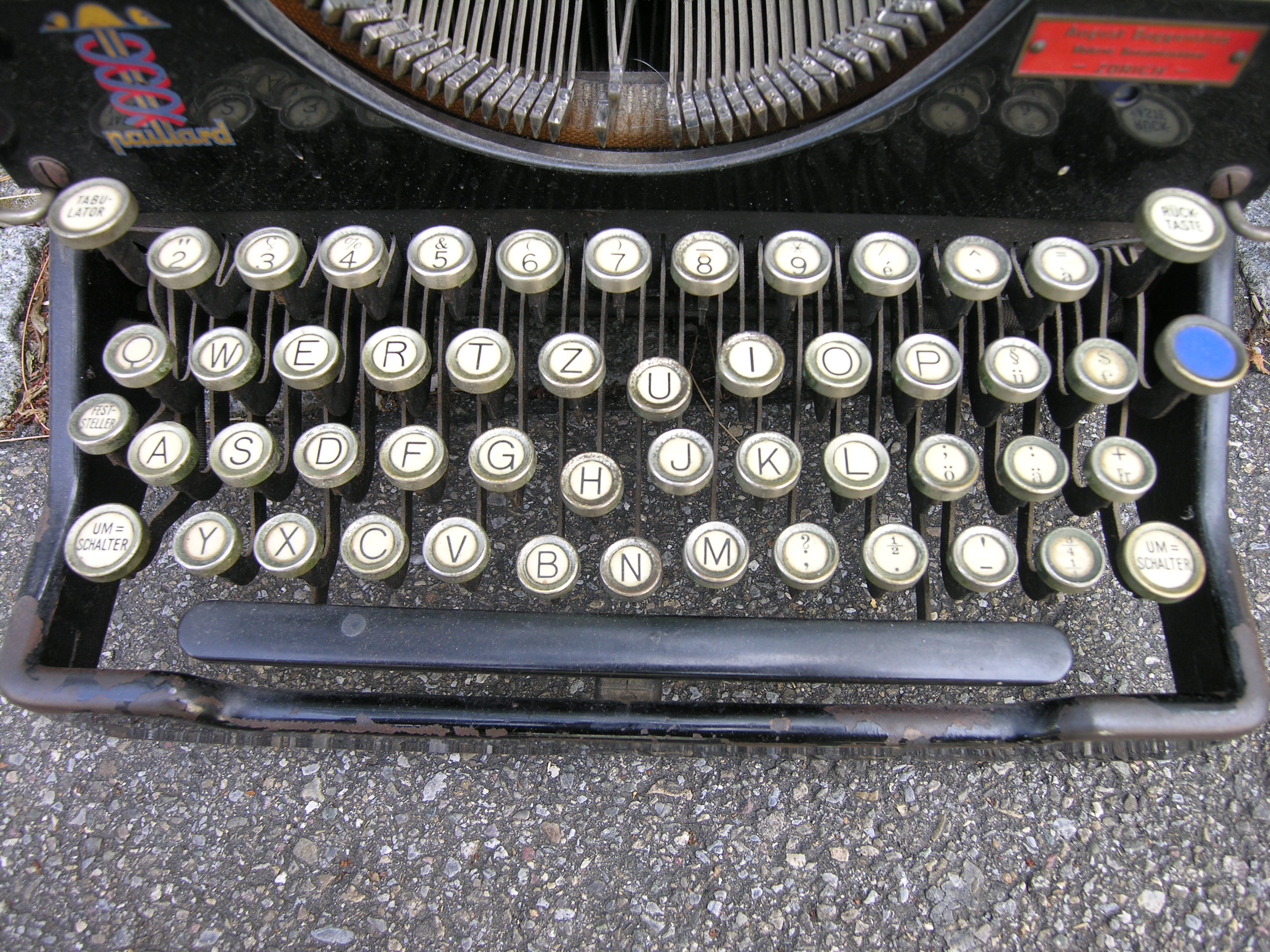
QWERTZ keyboard of old Swiss typewriter

The main difference between QWERTZ and QWERTY is that the positions of the Z and Y keys are switched (hence the nickname "kezboard"). This change possibly was made for three major reasons:

- Z is a much more common letter than Y in German; the latter appears only in loanwords (mainly from Ancient Greek) and in proper names such as Meyer.
- T and Z often appear next to each other in the German orthography, and typewriter jamming would be reduced by placing the two keys so they could be typed with separate hands.
- Z and U are also next to each other. Zu, meaning "to" in German, and also a very common prefix can also be written very easily.

Similar to many other non-English keyboards:

- Part of the keyboard is adapted to include language-specific characters, e.g. umlauted vowels (ä, ö, ü) in German, Austrian, and Swiss (German) keyboards; and frequently used accented letters (é, è, à) in Swiss (French) keyboards.
- QWERTZ keyboards usually change the right Alt key into an Alt Gr key to access a third level of key assignments. This is necessary because the language-specific characters leave no room to have all the special symbols of ASCII, needed by programmers among others, available on the first or second (shifted) levels without unduly increasing the size of the keyboard.
- The placements of some special symbols are changed when compared to the English (UK and US) versions of QWERTY.

Some of the special key inscriptions are often changed from an abbreviation to a graphical symbol (for example ⇪ Caps Lock becomes a hollow arrow pointing up, ← Backspace becomes a left-pointing arrow). In German and Austrian keyboards, most of the other abbreviated labels are in German: Ctrl (control) is translated to its German equivalent "Strg" for Steuerung, and Delete is abbreviated "Entf" (entfernen). Esc and ↵ Enter on the numeric keypad are not translated, however. (See: Key labels)

== Variants ==
The QWERTZ layout is widely used in German-speaking Europe as well as other Central European and Balkan countries that use the Latin script. While the core German-speaking countries use QWERTZ more or less exclusively, the situation among German-speakers in East Belgium, Luxembourg, and South Tyrol is more varied. The other countries using QWERTZ were historically parts of Austria-Hungary and/or had strong German technological, economic and cultural influences, which caused them to use German typewriters with the QWERTZ layout.

=== Albanian ===
QWERTZ is the default keyboard layout for the Albanian language in Microsoft Windows.

Albanian Keyboard

=== Austria and Germany ===
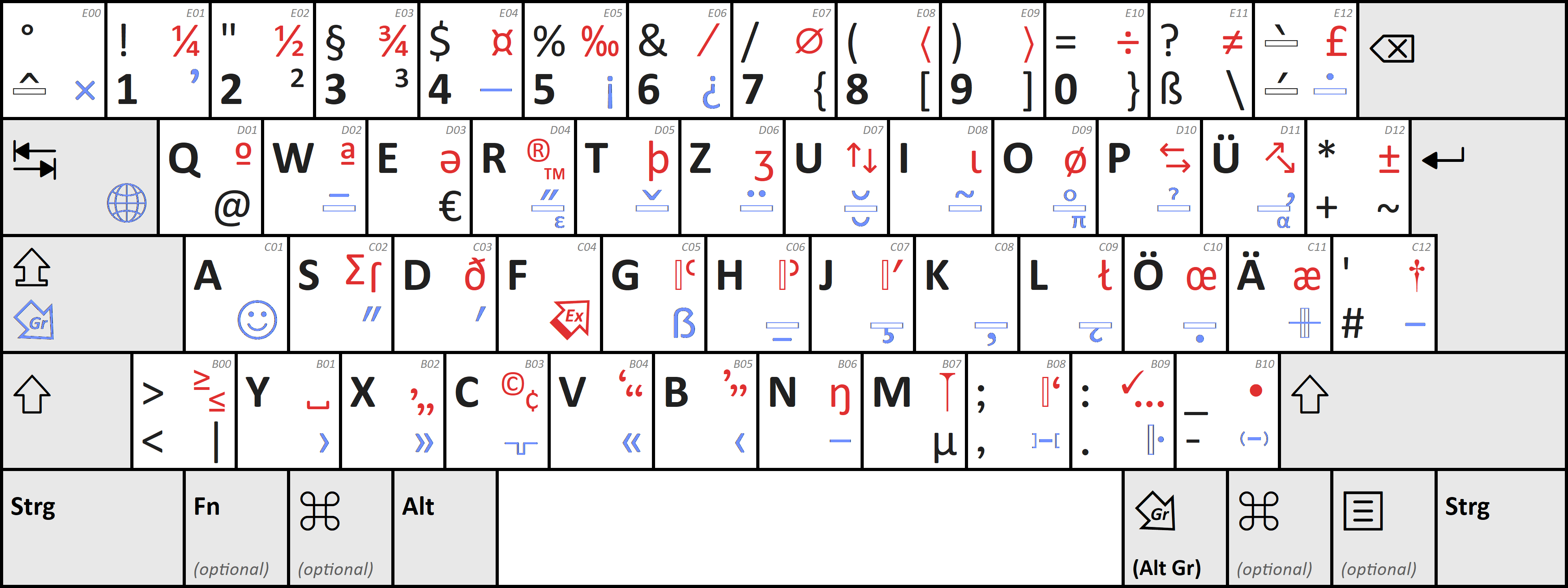
German extended keyboard layout E1 according to DIN 2137-01:2023-08. The characters shown in black are present in the traditional T1 layout also.

The PC keyboard layout commonly used in Germany and Austria is based on one defined in a former edition (October 1988) of the German standard DIN 2137-2. Since the edition DIN 2137:2012-06, it is standardized it as the first (basic) one of three layouts, calling it T1 (Tastaturbelegung 1, or "keyboard layout 1").

It employs dead keys to type accented characters like é, and the Alt Gr key to access characters in the third level (e.g. [, ], @, the euro sign €, or the micro sign µ). The German extended keyboard layout E1, as first specified in the 2018 edition and slightly revised in the 2023 edition of the German standard, also uses the group selection to access special characters like the long s, or foreign characters like "Æ" or "Ə".

==== Sorbian ====
Sorbian QWERTZ is practically identical to the German layout, but the additional Sorbian characters can be entered with dead keys. It has three different layouts: Standard, Legacy, and Extended. All are supported by Microsoft Windows (Windows 7 and later only).

=== Czech ===
Czech QWERTZ keyboard layout

The QWERTZ keyboard layout is commonly used in the Czech Republic, but the QWERTY variant is an unofficial option. The characters from the American keyboard (@#$&\|[]{}<>^`~*) and some other characters and diacritic signs (÷×¤€ßĐđŁł°˘˝·˛¸) that are missing on the Czech mechanical keyboard can be accessed with the AltGr key. The layout on the picture is supported by Microsoft Windows. The QWERTZ layout is more efficient for Czech, as the letter Z is slightly more common than the letter Y, but only 4% more efficient than QWERTY.

An internet poll in 2013 stated that 56% of Czech users used QWERTZ and 44% used QWERTY, but in 2020 57% of Czech users used QWERTY and 43% used QWERTZ. Detailed poll made on over 7,500 user showed that 41% use QWERTZ, 18% use Czech QWERTY, 12% use Czech QWERTY Programmers, 15% use US QWERTY and 13% use other keyboard layout.

=== Hungary ===
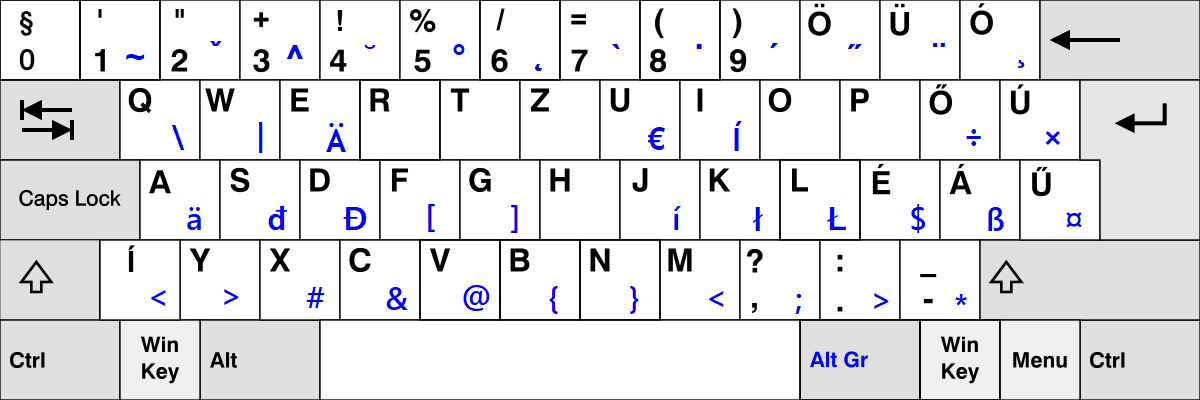
Hungarian keyboard layout

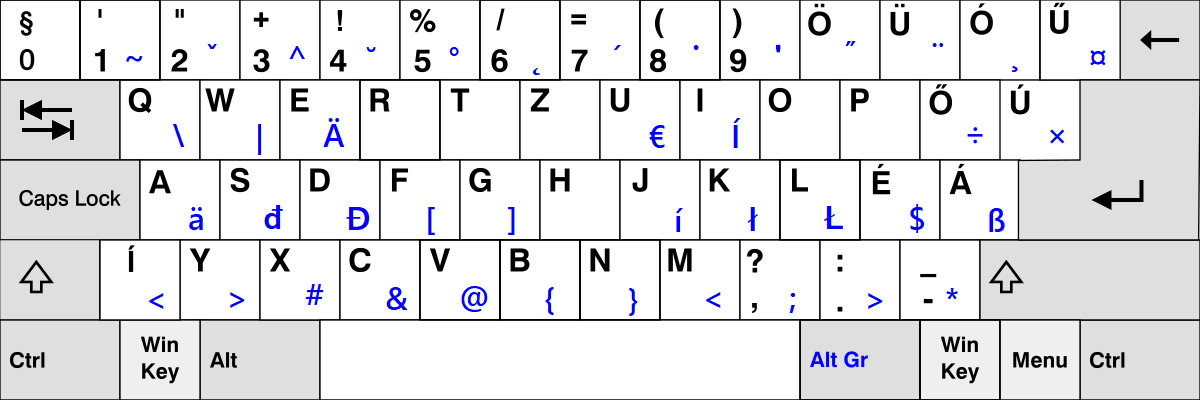
Alternative Hungarian keyboard layout

On some keyboards, the "ű" key is located to the left of the Enter key, while on others it is placed to the left of the backspace key (see the two pictures on the right).

An unusual feature of this Hungarian keyboard layout is the position of the 0 (zero): it is located to the left of the 1, so that most of the accented characters can be together on the right side of the keyboard.

The official layout is of type QWERTZ, which is therefore the most widely used keyboard layout in the country. QWERTY used to be widespread due to there not being a dedicated Hungarian layout commonly available for older computers, but since this is no longer an issue, virtually everyone uses QWERTZ in everyday computing.

On "ISO" keyboards (as in the first picture) and "BAE" keyboards (as in the second), the Í key is positioned on the key to the right of the left ⇧ Shift key. To adapt to 101/104-key (ANSI) keyboards which do not have that key, the MS Windows QWERTY layout has put the Í on the usual key for the 0 (zero) while the 0 has been moved to that key's tertiary (AltGr) layer; on Macintosh computers, both layouts (QWERTY and QWERTZ) have this adaptation.

=== Poland ===
Polish keyboard for typewriters according to PN-87

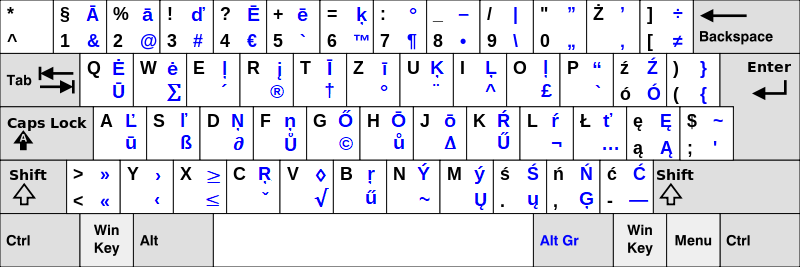
Polish QWERTZ keyboard used on Macintosh

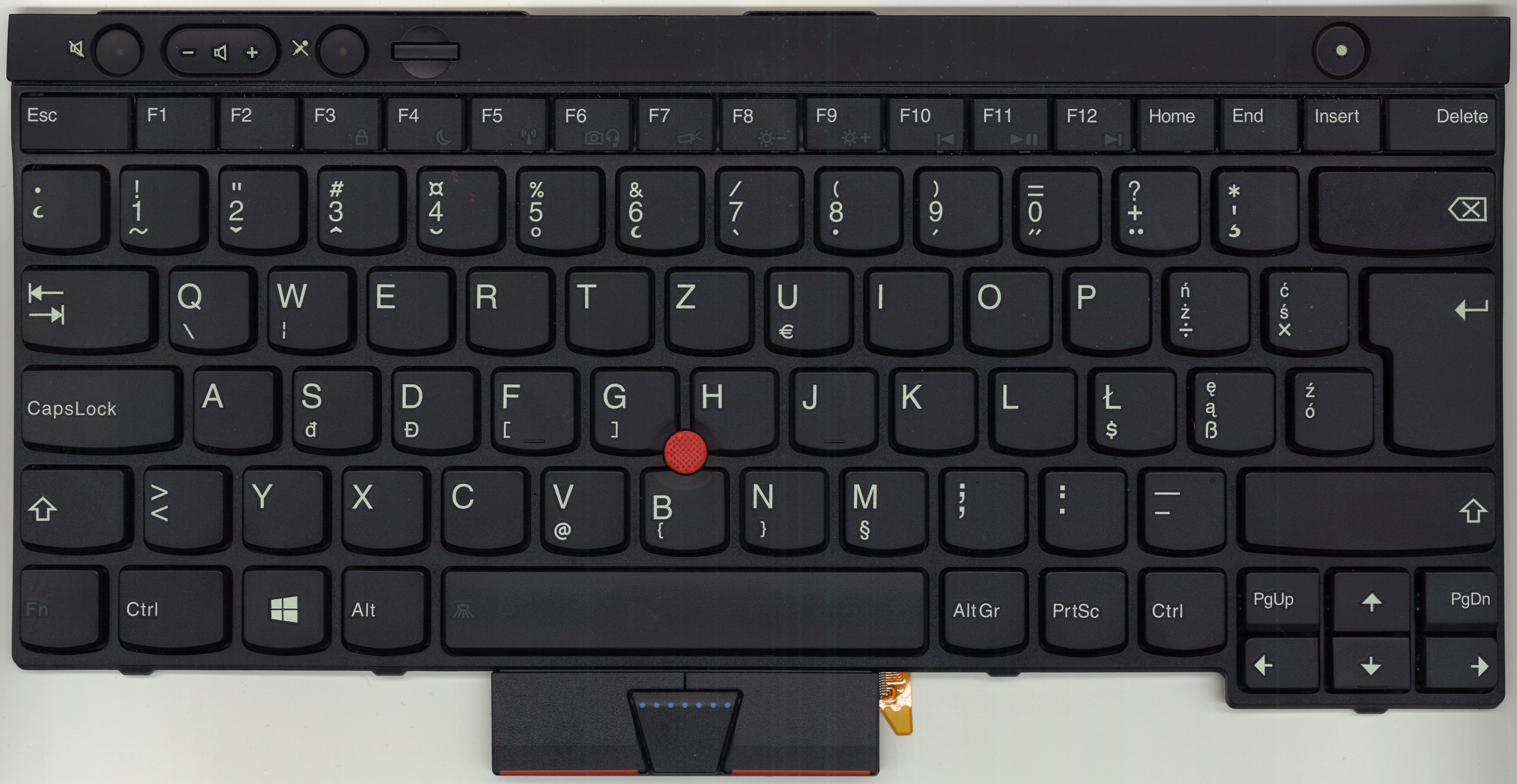
Layout PL-214 used in MS-DOS, Windows and Linux

A variant of the QWERTZ keyboard has been used in Poland, but QWERTY keyboards have been dominant since the early 1990s.

=== Romanian ===
The Romanian (default) keyboard from Windows 3.1 CE to XP/2003

The standard keyboard layout as established by the standard SR 13392:2004 is QWERTY. However, a Romanian QWERTZ keyboard (corresponding to older standards) was set up on Windows 3.1 and renamed "Romanian (Legacy)" on all versions since Windows Vista, because of the introduction of the two standard QWERTY layouts with the correct diacritics. Since it was devised before the disunification of "Ș" (S-comma) and "Ț" (T-comma) with "Ş" (S-cedilla; used in Turkic languages) and "Ţ" (T cedilla), the characters with cedilla were used in the layout (and these are still used in the default 1250 encoding). In 2012, a version with commas was made and it is available as a custom layout to be installed by the interested end-user.

=== Slovak ===
Slovak QWERTZ keyboard layout

Typewriters in Slovakia have used the QWERTZ layout quite similar to the layout used on the Czech typewriters. Slovak QWERTZ layout differs from the Czech one in using the letter ľ instead of the Czech ě on the same position, also the letter ť is on the position of Czech ř and the letter ô is on the position of Czech ů. There are 2 more keys that differ in these 2 languages: Slovak ä ( key replaces the Czech ( ) key and Slovak ň ) key replaces the Czech ' ¨ key. There are 17 characters from American keyboard (@#$&\|[]{}<>^`~*') that are missing on the Slovak keyboard because of the presence of the Slovak letters (ľščňťžôúáíýéä°´ˇ§). Users can access them with the AltGr key, however, the position of these characters varies between different operating systems. Besides the QWERTZ keyboard layout inherited from the typewriter era, QWERTY layout is also used by computer users in Slovakia. The only difference is that the Y and Z keys are swapped.

=== South Slavic Latin ===
Serbo-Croatian Latin and Slovene keyboard layout

The Serbo-Croatian Latin and Slovene keyboard layout has five additional special characters Č, Ć, Ž, Š and Đ. This keyboard layout was standardized in the 1980s in Yugoslavia. Characters Ć and Đ are only part of Gaj's Latin alphabet but not part of the Slovene alphabet, nevertheless they remain in Slovenian keyboards (for economic reasons, for historical reasons and for writing words in the closely related South Slavic languages). The Ž is on the right side of the Ć key on keyboards which have a longer backspace key, and the usual inverted L-shaped Enter key. The layout makes heavy use of the AltGr (right Alt) key for non-alphabetic characters and dead key combinations for adding diacritics to Latin characters. It is possible to type Albanian, Czech, German, Hungarian, Italian, Polish, Romanian, and Slovak using only the Serbo-Croatian keyboard layout.

There is a proposed variant of new Slovene keyboard layout, which would remove Ć and Đ from top layout and add @ instead. The command keys would also become translated into Slovene and some minor second level layout changes would be made.

For Serbian, there is also a Cyrillic keyboard variant, in which Q and W are replaced with Љ (Lj) and Њ (Nj) respectively.

However, the Apple keyboards for Croatian are QWERTY.

=== Swiss (German, French, Italian, Romansh), Liechtenstein, Luxembourg ===
Swiss keyboard layout

The layout of the Swiss keyboard is established by the national standard SN 074021:1999. It is designed to allow easy access to frequently used accents of the French, German and Italian languages and major currency signs. It was designed from the beginning for usage with multiple languages (not only those spoken in Switzerland) in mind. The difference between the Swiss German (sg) and the Swiss French (sf) layout is that the German variety has the German umlauts (ä, ö, ü) accessible in the unshifted state, while the French version has some French accented characters (é, à, è) accessible in the unshifted state. The actual keyboards have the keys engraved for both variations; the difference is only in the driver (software) settings. In the latest versions of Windows there are also separately listed driver settings for Swiss Italian and Swiss Romansh, but they correspond to the Swiss French and Swiss German layout, respectively. In Mac OS X 10.6 and Linux, only Swiss French and Swiss German are available, and on iPadOS, the only layout for Switzerland is Swiss German.

As Swiss German does not make use of the esszett (ß) ligature, on Windows its keyboard lacks the symbol in contrast to the German and Austrian QWERTZ layouts. Linux and macOS typically assign ß to Alt Gr+s and ⌥ Option+s respectively. While the German keyboard uses German labels for its keys (e.g. Strg instead of Ctrl), Swiss keyboards use the English abbreviations as a "neutral" solution to avoid favouring or excluding any of the national languages of Switzerland.

Unlike the Windows keyboard layouts used in France and Belgium, the Swiss layout does not have a key dedicated to the accented letter "ù". The MacOS layout typically assigns this letter to ⌥ Option+u.

Luxembourg does not have a keyboard layout of its own. Public education and administration use the Swiss-French keyboard which also represents the Microsoft Windows standard keyboard layout for Luxembourg, while some in the private sector prefer the Belgian AZERTY or American QWERTY layouts. Liechtenstein also use the Swiss German layout without an ß character.

== See also ==
- AZERTY – Keyboard layout used for French
- Blickensderfer typewriter – Typewriter invented by George Canfield Blickensderfer
- Dvorak keyboard layout – Keyboard layout for Latin-script alphabets
- Enigma machine – German cipher machine during World War II
- German keyboard layout – QWERTZ keyboard layout
- Neo (keyboard layout) – Keyboard layout optimized for German
- QWERTY – Keyboard layout for Latin-script alphabets
- QZERTY – Keyboard layout used mostly in Italy
