= British and American keyboards =

Keyboard Layouts

There are two major keyboard layouts (English language computer keyboard layouts): the United States layout and the United Kingdom layout defined in BS 4822 (48-key version). Both are QWERTY layouts. Users in the United States do not frequently need to make use of the £ (pound) and € (euro) currency symbols, which are common needs in the United Kingdom and Ireland, although the $ (dollar sign) symbol is also provided as standard on UK and Irish keyboards. In other countries which predominantly use English as a common working language, such as Australia, Canada (in English-speaking parts), and New Zealand, the US keyboard is commonly used.

== Windows keyboards ==
The UK variant of the Enhanced keyboard commonly used with personal computers designed for Microsoft Windows differs from the US layout as follows:

- The UK keyboard has 1 more key than the U.S. keyboard (UK=62, US=61, on the typewriter keys, 102 v 101 including function and other keys, 105 vs 104 on models with Windows keys)
- The extra key is added next to the Enter key to accommodate # (number sign) and ~ (tilde)
- The Alt key to the right of the space bar is replaced by an AltGr key
- The £ (pound sign) takes the place vacated by the number sign on the 3 key
- The ¬ (negation) takes the place vacated by tilde on the ` (grave accent) key
  - ⇧ Shift+` produces ¬
  - AltGr+` produces ¦ (broken bar, shown as a secondary symbol)
- € (Euro sign) is produced by AltGr+4 and is shown as a secondary symbol
- @ and " are swapped (to ⇧ Shift+' and ⇧ Shift+2, respectively)
- The \ key is moved to the left of the Z key (⇧ Shift+\ still produces |)
- The Enter key spans two rows, and is narrower to accommodate the #/~ key
- AltGr+vowel produces the acute accent variant of that vowel as needed for Irish. Diacritics used in Scots Gaelic and Welsh require the UK extended keyboard setting.
- Some UK keyboards do not label Backspace, Enter, Tab and Shift in words

United Kingdom keyboard layout for a computer running Windows

United States keyboard layout

In early versions of Microsoft Windows, input language defaults were coupled directly to physical keyboard layouts. Selecting "English (United Kingdom)" automatically assigned the UK physical keyboard layout, which mapped characters differently from the standard United States keyboard layout used in many Commonwealth jurisdictions (such as Australia, Canada, India, and South Africa).

Users in these regions who used US-layout hardware often chose "English (United States)" as their system locale so their physical keys matched the screen output. As a side effect of this configuration, word processing software defaulted to US English spellchecking, flagging standard British and Commonwealth spellings like "colour" and "centre" as errors unless the user reconfigured the layout or dictionary settings.

Subsequent editions of Windows decoupled regional language settings from physical keyboard layouts, allowing users to pair any regional language variety (such as English (Australia) or English (Canada)) independently with a US physical keyboard layout.

=== International or extended keyboard layouts ===
US International keyboard layout

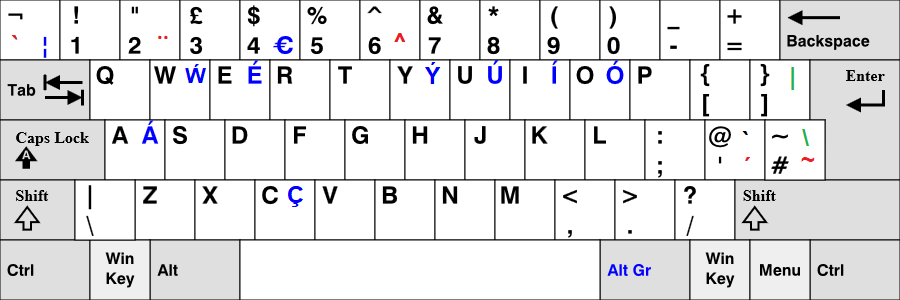
United Kingdom Extended keyboard layout

Since the default US keyboard layout in Microsoft Windows offers no way of inputting any sort of diacritic or accent, this makes it unsuitable for all but a handful of languages unless the US International layout is used. The US International layout changes the ` (grave), ~ (tilde), ^ (circumflex), " (double quote, to make diaeresis), and ' (apostrophe, to make acute accent) keys into dead keys for producing accented characters: thus for example ' (release) a will produce á. The US International layout also uses the right alt (AltGr) as a modifier to enter special characters.

The equivalent mapping for UK/Irish keyboards is called the "UK Extended" layout which, if activated in settings, will allow the user to enter a wide variety of diacritics (such as grave accents) which are not accommodated by the standard UK/Irish layout. In particular, à,è,ì,ò,ù used in Scots Gaelic can be made (using `, release and then the vowel), the ŵ and ŷ used in Welsh (using AltGr+6 (^), release, then w etc.). Likewise, the Spanish and Portuguese letters ñ and õ can be made (using AltGr+# (~), release, then n etc.).

For more specialized uses, there is a facility in Windows for users to create a customized layout that may match their needs more precisely.

== Apple Macintosh keyboards ==
U.S. layout

British layout

The default U.S. layout on Apple Macintosh computers allows input of diacritical characters as the entire MacRoman character set is directly accessible. A U.S. international layout is also available.

Macintosh keyboards for British typists makes use of an Apple-custom layout. This differs significantly from the British Standard BS 4822 layout found on most UK keyboards. Differences include:

- The € symbol is assigned to ⌥ Option+^{@}_{2}, rather than ⌥ Option+^{$}_{4}.
- The # symbol is assigned to ⌥ Option+^{£}_{3}, rather than a dedicated key.
- The ¬ and ¦ dedicated key is absent.
- The ± and § dedicated key is present.
- The ` and ~, and the \ and | keys are moved.

The U.S. layout follows the ANSI convention of having an enter key in the third row, while the UK layout follows ISO and has a stepped double-height key spanning the second and third rows.

MacOS provides support for diacritics using either a "press and hold for pop-up menu" or a more extensive 'dead-key' facility. It is possible to install multiple keyboard layouts within an operating system and switch between them, either through features implemented within the OS, or through an external application. MacOS has facilities that enables users to add further keyboard layouts ('keyboard mappings') and to choose from them.

== Other keyboard layouts ==
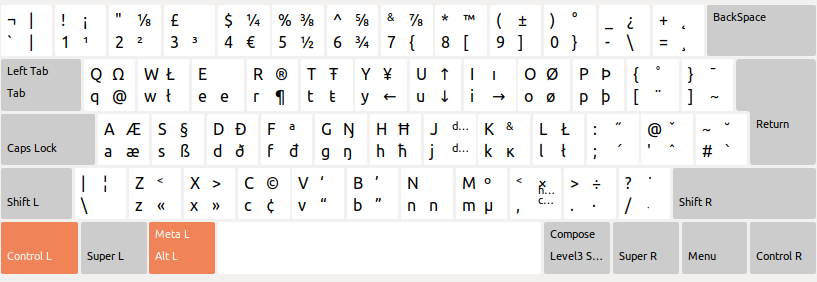
UK International keyboard layout (Linux)

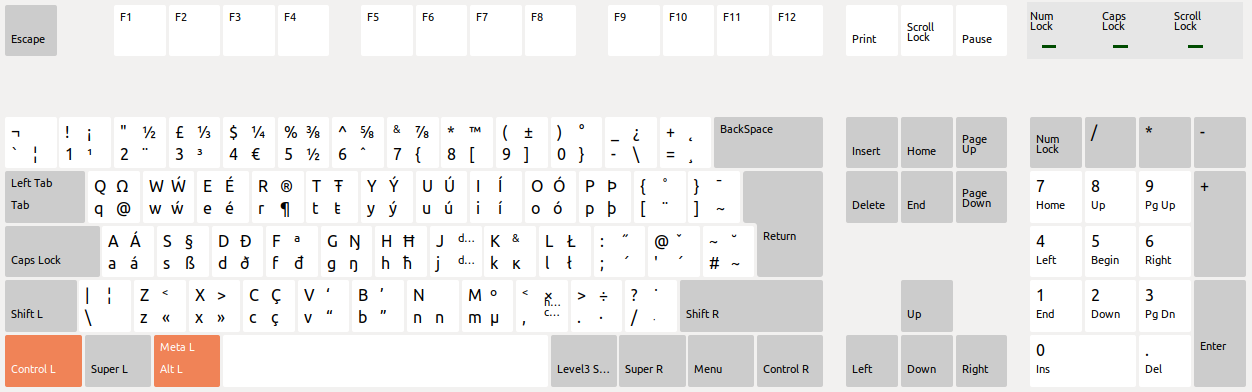
United Kingdom Extended Keyboard Layout for Linux

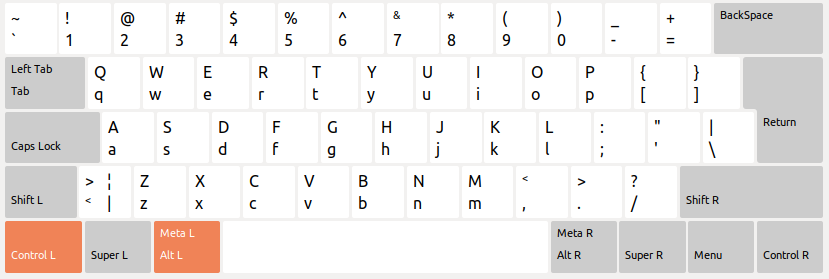
US keyboard layout (Linux)

Other operating systems can optionally re-map the keyboard layout or have different modifier keys (for example the Amiga keyboard has "A" modifier keys and BBC Micro or Acorn keyboards often had a "Shift Lock" as well as a "Caps Lock").

Under Unix/Linux the "Windows" key is often called the "Super" key and can be re-mapped by users for specific functionality but in most programs by default does nothing.

Some older Unix/Linux software, such as Emacs, uses the left Alt key as a "Meta" key, which harks back to older MIT or LISP computers.

ChromeOS uses the US and UK Windows layouts, except that the Caps-Lock key is labelled with a "fisheye" (◉) and by default acts as an "everything" search key. (There is an option in Settings to revert it to convention). The function-key row is also differently labelled. The UK-extended layout for ChromeOS is provided by a Chrome add-on, and provides ready access to a substantially greater (than Windows) repertoire of precomposed characters for western, central and eastern European (Latin alphabet) languages.

== Dvorak layouts ==
The modern Dvorak Simplified Keyboard (UK layout)

The modern Dvorak Simplified Keyboard (US layout)

There are also Dvorak Layouts for each region.

== Typewriters ==
British typewriter keyboard layout, variant 1 (full)

British typewriter keyboard layout, variant 2 (portable)

American typewriter keyboard layout

IBM Selectric American keyboard layout (the predecessor of the modern US layout)

== See also ==
- Keyboard layout
- Technical standards in Hong Kong
