= List of Latin-script keyboard layouts =

QWERTY, along with its direct derivatives such as QWERTZ and AZERTY, is the primary keyboard layout for the Latin alphabet. However, there are also keyboard layouts that do not resemble QWERTY very closely, if at all. Some of these are used for languages where QWERTY may be unsuitable. Others are specially designed to reduce finger movement and are claimed by some proponents to offer higher typing speed along with ergonomic benefits.

== Comparison ==
This is a chart of alternative keyboard layouts for typing Latin-script characters. National and specialized versions of QWERTY which do not change the letter keys are not included.

Layout	Design priorities	Base language, country	Homing keys	Created year	# changes from QWERTY	Backspace location	Extra arrow keys?	Programmer features?	Math and symbols?	Modifiers (#core, #aux)	Dead keys?
QWERTY	Various	English, United States	F J	1870 (approx.)	0	top right	No	No	mostly no	Varies	Varies
Dvorak	Ergonomics (hand alternation)	English, United States	U H	1936	28	top right	No	Varies	No	1 main, 1 aux	Varies
Colemak	Ergonomics (total movement, combos); QWERTY learning	English, United States	T N	2006	17	center left (QWERTY capslock)	No	No	No	1 main, 1 aux	14 aux; acute accent non-dead
Workman	Ergonomics (lateral extension, finger-specific); QWERTY learning	English, United States	T N	2010	22	center left (QWERTY capslock)	No	Varies	No	1 main, 1 aux	14 aux; acute accent non-dead
Neo	Ergonomics (home row, alternation)	German, Germany	E N	2010	28	top right, and shifted alternate	Yes	Yes (home-area shifted punctuation)	Yes (<100)	3 main	3 main; 8 shifted; 6 aux
BÉPO	Ergonomics (combos, home row)	French, France	E T	2004–2006	29	center left (QWERTY capslock)	No	Yes (unshifted punctuation)	Some (<50)	1 main, 1 aux	14 aux
Asset	QWERTY similarity; Ergonomics (combos, home row)	English, United States	T N	2006	15	center left (QWERTY capslock)	No	No	No	1 main	No
Minimak	QWERTY learning; Ergonomics (total movement, repetition)	English, United States	T N	2012	8 default (versions with 4 or 12 available)	center left (QWERTY capslock)	No	No	No	1 main, 1 aux	?
QWPR	QWERTY learning; Ergonomics (total movement, repetition)	English, United States	T N	2013	11	left (QWERTY tab), top right	Yes	Yes (home-area shifted punctuation)	Yes (>>100)	2 main	1 main, 2 shifted, 14 aux, 6 doubled
JCUKEN (Latin)	Phonetic similarity to ЙЦУКЕН	International, Soviet Union	A O	1919	30	top right	No	No	No	?	?
HCESAR	Ergonomics for Portuguese (letter frequency and hand muscles)	Portuguese, Portugal	D U	1937	29	top right	No	No	No	?	2 main, 3 shifted
Turkish (F-keyboard)	Ergonomics for Turkish (letter frequency and hand muscles)	Turkish, Turkey	A K	1955	27	top right	No	No	No	?	?

== See also ==
- IBM PC keyboard
- Apple Keyboard
