= Lenore Fenton MacClain =

American champion typist (1912–2005)

- Born: Lenore Lillian Fenton; July 31, 1912; Snokomish, Washington, U.S.
- Died: March 9, 2005 (aged 92); Williamsburg, Virginia, U.S.
- Spouse: George MacClain
- Children: 1

Lenore Lillian Fenton MacClain was an American championship typist and typewriting educator. She won numerous international typewriting awards and international records in typing.

== Biography ==
MacClain was from Snohomish, Washington. After briefly attending Whitman College, she graduated from the University of Washington with undergraduate and master's degrees She worked as a high school teacher and married George MacClain, a colonel in the U.S. Army, in the late 1940s.

=== Typing contests ===
In 1937 MacClain won a novice typing award with a speed of 87 words per minute. She won again in 1938, and in 1939 she broke her own transcription record and earned the title of "the world's greatest secretary". Earlier, she won the world championship on a Dvorak keyboard in Tenth Annual International Commercial Schools Contest in Chicago, June 19, 1946, by typing 131 net words per minute. In 1956, Popular Science noted that she had won so many typing contests that she cancelled additional contests. MacClain was listed in the 1971 edition of the Guinness Book of World Records for being the fastest typist in a one-hour timed test.

She became one of the students of August Dvorak and upon switching from a QWERTY layout to the Dvorak keyboard layout, MacClain increased her typing rate from 70 words per minute to 182 words per minute. MacClain's increased typing speed is given as an example in the discussions regarding the benefits of the Dvorak keyboard over the QWERTY layout. While it was first reported that she could type 180 words per minute, this number later edited to be 108 words per minute.

=== Teaching typing ===
In 1943, she starred in United States Navy typewriting training videos, where she demonstrated proper touch typing technique, useful typewriter tips and tricks (such as rapid envelope addressing).

In 1954, along with J. Frank Dame, she co-authored a book Typewriting Techniques and Short Cuts, which saw a few editions and was reviewed by the Journal of Business Education. MacClain and her techniques are used as examples on how to type, and from 1951 until 1958 she was a typing instructor at Bolling Air Force Base. She taught people as young as fifth grade typing using either the QWERTY layout or the Dvorak keyboard.

=== Later life ===
MacClain and her husband moved to Arlington County, Virginia. She was the president of the Virginia chapter of the P.E.O. Sisterhood educational organization, and in that position led the state-wide convention in 1965.

She died on March 9, 2005, in Williamsburg, Virginia, and was buried at the Arlington National Cemetery in the same plot as her husband, who died on June 6, 1994. Her Electromatic typewriter with a Dvorak Simplified Keyboard layout is in the collection of the National Museum of American History.

== Select publications ==
- MacClain, Lenore Fenton; Dame, J. Frank (1948-01-01). Typewriting techniques and short cuts in 15-minute timed writings. South-western.
- MacClain, Lenore Fenton (1961). Typewriting Techniques and Short Cuts; with 10-minute Timed Writings. South-Western Publishing Company.
