= Quotation mark =

Punctuation mark with various forms

“ ” " " ‘ ’ ' 'o

English quotation marks
- Other names: quotes, quote marks, speech marks, inverted commas, talking marks
« »	「 」
Guillemets	CJK brackets

Quotation marks (Note: Also known as quotes, quote marks, speech marks, inverted commas, or talking marks.) are punctuation marks used in pairs in various writing systems to identify direct speech, a quotation, or a phrase. The pair consists of an opening quotation mark and a closing quotation mark, which may or may not be the same glyph. Quotation marks have a variety of forms in different languages and in different media.

== History ==
The single quotation mark is traced to Ancient Greek practice, adopted and adapted by monastic copyists. Isidore of Seville, in his seventh-century encyclopedia, Etymologiae, described their use of the Greek diplé, a symbol like a right angle bracket:

[13] ⟩ Diple. Hanc scriptores nostri adponunt in libris ecclesiasticorum virorum ad separanda vel [ad] demonstranda testimonia sanctarum Scripturarum.

Translation:

[13] ⟩ Diplé. Our copyists place this sign in the books of the people of the Church, to separate or to indicate the quotations drawn from the Holy Scriptures.

The double quotation mark derives from a marginal notation used in fifteenth-century manuscript annotations to indicate a passage of particular importance (not necessarily a quotation); the notation was placed in the outside margin of the page and was repeated alongside each line of the passage. In his edition of the works of Aristotle, which appeared in 1483 or 1484, the Milanese Renaissance humanist Francesco Filelfo marked literal and appropriate quotes with oblique double dashes on the left margin of each line. Until then, literal quotations had been highlighted or not at the author's discretion. Non-verbal loans were marked on the edge. After the publication of Filelfo's edition, the quotation marks for literal quotations prevailed. During the seventeenth century this treatment became specific to quoted material, and it grew common, especially in Britain, to print quotation marks (now in the modern opening and closing forms) at the beginning and end of the quotation as well as in the margin; the French usage is a remnant of this. In most other languages, including English, the marginal marks dropped out of use in the last years of the eighteenth century. The usage of a pair of marks, opening and closing, at the level of lower case letters was generalized.

Guillemets by the Imprimerie nationale in Bulletin de l'Agence générale des colonies, No. 302, May 1934, showing the usage of a pair of marks, opening and closing, at the level of lower case letters

Clash between the apostrophe and curved quotation marks in a phrase meaning "the crimes of the 'good Samaritans' "

By the nineteenth century, the design and usage began to be specific to each region. In Western Europe the custom became to use the quotation mark pairs with the convexity of each mark aimed outward. In Britain those marks were elevated to the same height as the top of capital letters: “...”.

Clearly distinguishable apostrophe and angular quotation marks.

Blank space (in yellow) provoked by elevated quotation marks; some type designers consider this excessive.

In France, by the end of the nineteenth century, the marks were modified to an angular shape. Some authors claim that the reason for this was a practical one, in order to get a character that was clearly distinguishable from apostrophes, commas, and parentheses. Also, in other scripts, the angular quotation marks are distinguishable from other punctuation characters: the Greek breathing marks, the Armenian emphasis and apostrophe, the Arabic comma, the decimal separator, the thousands separator, etc. Other authors claim that the reason for this was an aesthetic one: the elevated quotation marks created extra white space before and after the word, below the quotation marks. This was considered aesthetically unpleasing, while the in-line quotation marks helped to maintain the typographical color, since the quotation marks had the same height and were aligned with the lower case letters. Nevertheless, while other languages do not insert spaces between the quotation marks and the word(s) quoted, the French usage does insert them, even if they are narrow spaces.

The curved quotation marks ("66–99") usage, “...”, was exported to some non-Latin scripts, notably where there was some English influence, for instance in Native American scripts and Indic scripts. On the other hand, Greek, Cyrillic, Arabic and Ethiopic adopted the French "angular" quotation marks, «...». The angle bracket quotation marks, 《...》, are also a development of the in-line angular quotation marks. These marks are standard in the Hanzi (Chinese 汉字), Hanja (Korean 漢字), and modern Hangul (Korean 한글) scripts. In Chinese, they serve as the standard punctuation for book, album, and other work titles. In South Korea, they are recognized as valid punctuation for indicating such titles. In North Korea, they serve as the standard punctuation for book, album, and other work titles.

In Central Europe, the practice was to use the quotation mark pairs with the convexity aimed inward. The German tradition preferred the curved quotation marks, the first one at the level of the commas, the second one at the level of the apostrophes: „...“. Alternatively, these marks could be angular and in-line with lower case letters, but still pointing inward: »...«. Some neighboring regions adopted the German curved marks tradition with lower–upper alignment, while some, e.g. Poland, adopted a variant with the convexity of the closing mark aimed rightward like the opening one, „...”.

Sweden (and Finland) chose a convention where the convexity of both marks was aimed to the right but lined up both at the top level: ”...”.

In Eastern Europe, there was hesitation between the French tradition «...» and the German tradition „...“. The French tradition prevailed in Eastern Europe (Russia, Ukraine, and Belarus), whereas the German tradition, or its modified version with the convexity of the closing mark aimed rightward, has become dominant in Southeastern Europe, e.g. in the Balkan countries. In Romania the: „...” version is officially recognized by the Romanian Academy.

In some languages using the angular quotation marks, the usage of the single guillemet, ‹...›, became obsolete, being replaced by double curved ones: “...”, though the single ones still survive, for instance, in Switzerland. In Russia, Ukraine and Belarus, the curved quotation marks, „...“, are used as a secondary level or in handwriting, while the angular marks, «...», are used as the primary level on printed text.

== In English ==
In English writing, quotation marks are placed in pairs around a word or phrase to indicate:

- Quotation or direct speech: Carol said "Go ahead" when I asked her if the launcher was ready.
- Mention in another work of the title of a short or subsidiary work, such as a chapter or an episode: "Encounter at Farpoint" was the pilot episode of Star Trek: The Next Generation.
- Scare quotes, used to mean "so-called" or to express sarcasm: The "fresh" bread was all dried up.

In American writing, quotation marks are normally the double kind (the primary style). If quotation marks are used inside another pair of quotation marks, then single quotation marks are used. For example: "Didn't she say 'I like red best' when I asked her wine preferences?" he asked his guests. If another set of quotation marks is nested inside single quotation marks, double quotation marks are used again, and they continue to alternate as necessary (though this is rarely done).

British publishing is regarded as more flexible about whether double or single quotation marks should be used. A tendency to use single quotation marks in British writing is thought to have arisen after the mid-19th century invention of steam-powered presses and the consequent rise of London and New York as distinct, industrialized publishing centers whose publishing houses adhered to separate norms. The King's English in 1908 noted that the prevailing British practice was to use double marks for most purposes, and single ones for quotations within quotations. Different media now follow different conventions in the United Kingdom.

Different varieties and styles of English have different conventions regarding whether terminal punctuation should be written inside or outside the quotation marks. North American printing usually puts full stops and commas (but not colons, semicolons, exclamation or question marks) inside the closing quotation mark, whether it is part of the original quoted material or not. Styles elsewhere vary widely and have different rationales for placing it inside or outside, often a matter of house style.

== Typographic forms ==
Regarding their appearance, two shape classifications of quotation marks are used in English-language texts:

- '...' and "..." are known as neutral, vertical, straight, typewriter, dumb, or ASCII quotation marks. The left and right marks are identical. These are the symbols found on typical QWERTY keyboards, although they are sometimes automatically converted to the other type by software.
- ‘...’ and “...” are known as typographic, curly, curved, book, or smart quotation marks. (The doubled ones are more informally known as "66 and 99".) The beginning marks look like commas raised to the ascender line and rotated 180 degrees (and thus known as 'inverted commas'). The ending marks look like commas raised to the ascender line. Curved quotation marks are used mainly in manuscript, printing, and typesetting. Type cases (of any language) generally have the curved quotation mark metal types for the respective language, and may lack the vertical quotation mark metal types. Because most computer keyboards lack keys to enter typographic quotation marks directly, much that is written using word-processing programs has vertical quotation marks. The "smart quotes" feature in some computer software can convert vertical quotation marks to curly ones, although sometimes inappropriately.

The closing or right single quotation mark is identical in form to the apostrophe and similar to the prime symbol. The double quotation mark is identical to the ditto mark in English-language usage. It is also similar to—and often used to represent—the double prime symbol. These all serve different purposes and have distinct Unicode codepoints.

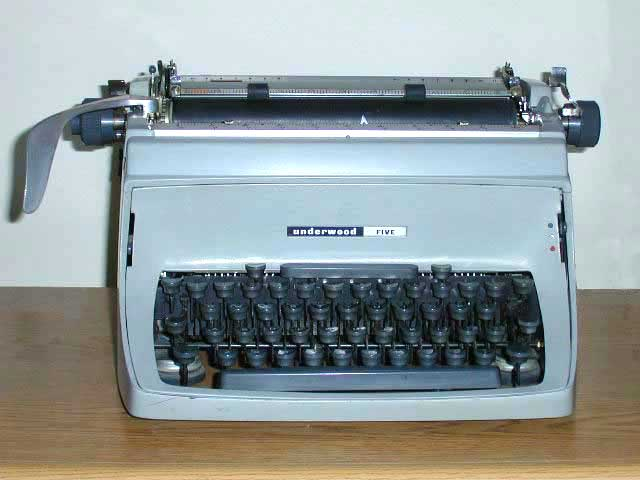
A typewriter

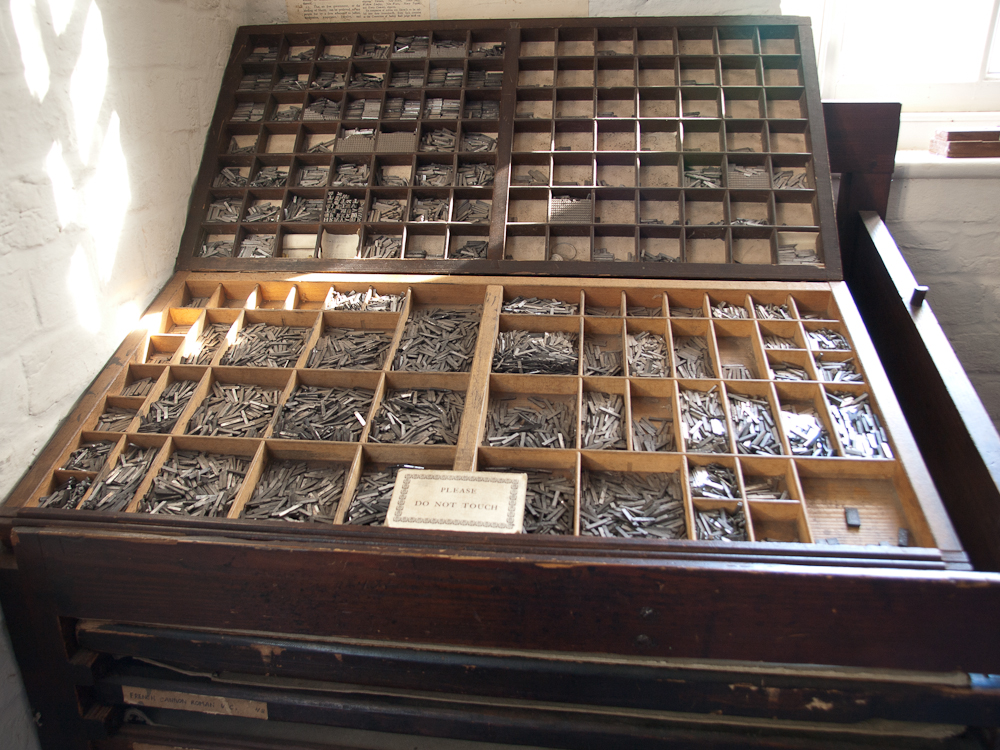
A type case containing sorts of movable type

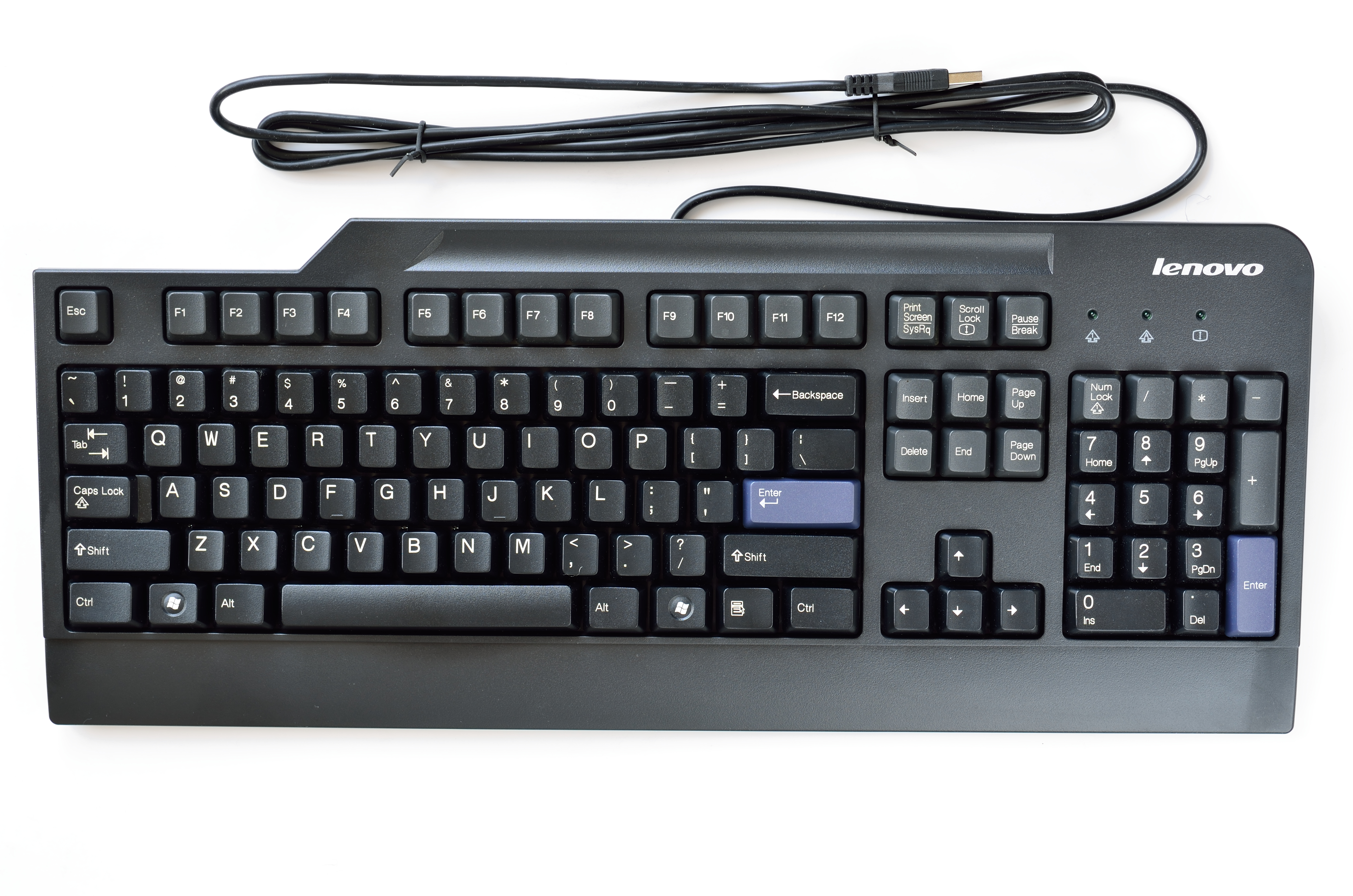
A wired computer keyboard for desktop use

== Summary table ==
Other languages have similar conventions to English, but use different symbols or different placement.

Language	ISO-639	Standard			Alternative			Spacing	Names	Notes & references
Language	ISO-639	Primary	Secondary	Notes	Primary	Secondary	Notes	Spacing	Names	Notes & references
Afrikaans	af	“...”	‘...’		„...”	‚...’	(Note: Traditional.)		aanhalingsteken (quotation)	
Albanian	sq	„...“	‘...’						thonjëza (quotes)	
Amharic	am	«...»	‹...›		“...”	‘...’			ትምህርተ ጥቅስ (timihirite t’ik’isi, quote)	
Arabic	ar	«...»			“...”			Optional	علامات تنصيص (ʻalāmāt tanṣīṣ, quotation marks)	(Note: Direction of text is right-to-left.)
Armenian	hy	«...»							չակերտներ (chakertner, quotation marks)	
Azerbaijani	az	“...”	"..."		„...“			0–1 pt	dırnaq işarəsi (fingernail mark)	
Basque	eu	«...»	“...”		“...”	‘...’			komatxoak	
Belarusian	be	«...»	„...“		„...“				двукоссе (dvukossie, double commas); лапкі (lapki, little paws)	
Bosnian	bs	”...”; „...”	’...’		»...«				”...” navodnici, наводници, znaci navoda, знаци навода (quotation marks); ’...’ polunavodnici, полунаводници (half-quotation marks)	»...« is used only in printed media.
Bulgarian	bg	„...“	’...’; ‘...’ (Note: Rarely used.)	(Note: A quotation dash is preferred for dialogue.)	«...»	’...’; ‘...’			кавички (kavichki) (or стандартни кавички, двойни кавички (standartni/dvoyni kavichki) for the main types of quotation marks (also called double quotation mark(s)), and единични кавички, вторични кавички (edinichni/vtorichni kavichki) for the secondary quotation marks (also called single quotation mark(s)).	
Catalan	ca	«...»	“...”	(Note: A closing quotation mark is added to the beginning of each new paragraph.)	“...”	‘...’		none	«...» cometes franceses (French quotation marks); “...” cometes angleses (English quotation marks); ‘...’ cometes simples (Simple quotation marks)	
Chinese, simplified	zh	“⋯”; 『⋯』 (Note: Only used when text is written vertically (up-to-down and right-to-left).)	‘⋯’; 「⋯」		「⋯」	『⋯』		Fullwidth form	“⋯” 双引号 (pinyin: shuāng yǐn hào, double quotation mark); ‘⋯’ 单引号 (pinyin: dān yǐn hào, single quotation mark)	
Chinese, traditional	zh_TW	「⋯」 (Note: Rotated for use in horizontal text; originally written ﹁⋮﹂ and ﹃⋮﹄ in vertical text); 「⋯」	『⋯』; 『⋯』		“⋯”	‘⋯’		Fullwidth form	「⋯」單引號 (pinyin: dān yǐn hào; Jyutping: daan1 jan5 hou6, single quotation mark); 『⋯』雙引號 (pinyin: shuāng yǐn hào; Jyutping: soeng1 jan5 hou6, double quotation mark)	
Croatian	hr	„...”	‘...’		»...«				„...” and »...« navodnici (quotation marks); ‘...’ polunavodnici (single quotes)	
Czech	cs	„...“	‚...‘		»...«	›...‹			uvozovky (introduce)	
Danish	da	»...«; „...“	›...‹; ‚...‘		”...”; “...”	’...’; ‘...’			citationstegn (citation marks); anførselstegn (indication marks); gåseøjne (goose eyes)	The standard forms are most common in literature and some newspapers. The alternative forms are more common in everyday use, due to being easily available on keyboards.; The Danish Language Council calls the specific shape of quotation marks primarily a question of typography, and only recommend that they should be hard to confuse for other punctuation marks and be applied consistently within a text.
Dutch	nl	“...”	‘...’		„...”	‚...’			enkele aanhalingstekens, dubbele aanhalingstekens (single/double citation marks); ‘...’ zogenaamdfunctie (scare quotes)	Double citation marks are only used in literal citations; The sequence when using primary and secondary level is a recommendation, not a rule.
English: UK, Australia, New Zealand	en_GB, en_AU, en_NZ	‘...’	“...”	(Note: Within a quotation, the opening quotation mark is repeated at the beginning of each new paragraph.)	“...”	‘...’		1–2 pt	Quotation marks, double quotes, quotes, inverted commas, speech marks	Usage of single or double as primary varies across English varieties.
English: US, Canada, South Africa	en_US, en_CA, en_ZA	“...”	‘...’					1–2 pt	Quotation marks, double quotes, quotes, inverted commas, speech marks	Usage of single or double as primary varies across English varieties.
Esperanto	eo	“...”	‘...’	(Note: Usage may vary, depending on the native language of the author and publisher.)	«...»; „...“	‹...›; ‚...‘			citiloj (lit. quoting tools)	
Estonian	et	„...“			«...»				jutumärgid (speech marks); hanejalad (goose feet)	
Filipino	tl_PH	“...”	‘...’						panipi	
Finnish	fi	”...”	’...’		»...»	’...’			lainausmerkit (citation marks)	
French: France	fr_FR	« ... »	« ... »	(Note: Redundant closing quotes are omitted. Informal usage often follows the Belgian/French Canadian style, with double quotation marks at the second level instead of additional guillemets.)	“...”	‘...’	(Note: English orthography for quotations is often used in informal digital communication, but is not recommended by any style guide.)	non-breaking	guillemets (William)	Dialogue can be written with long dashes, in addition to instead of guillemets.
French: Belgium,Canada	fr_BE, fr_CA	« ... »	“...”		“...”	‘...’	(Note: English orthography for quotations is often used in informal digital communication, but is not recommended by any style guide.)	non-breaking	guillemets (William)	Dialogue can be written with long dashes, in addition to instead of guillemets.
French: Switzerland (Note: In Switzerland the same style is used for all four national languages.)	fr_CH	« ... »	‹ ... ›		“...”	‘...’	(Note: English orthography for quotations is often used in informal digital communication, but is not recommended by any style guide.)	narrow non-breaking	guillemets (William)	Dialogue can be written with long dashes, in addition to instead of guillemets.
Galician	gl	«...»	“...”		“...”	‘...’			comiñas; aspas	
Georgian	ka	„...“			none			none	ბრჭყალები (brč’q’alebi, claws)	
German	de	„...“	‚...‘		»...«	›...‹			Anführungszeichen (quotation marks); Gänsefüßchen (little goose feet); Hochkommas, Hochkommata (high commas)	
German, Switzerland; Swiss German	de_CH	«...»	‹...›		„...“	‚...‘			Anführungszeichen (quotation marks); Gänsefüßchen (little goose feet); Hochkommas, Hochkommata (high commas)	
Greek	el	«...»	“...”; ‟...” (Note: Traditional typographical practice.)						εισαγωγικά (eisagogiká, introductory marks)	
Hebrew	he	”...„	’...‚		"..."	'...'			מֵירְכָאוֹת (merkha'ot)	Not to be confused with גֵּרְשַׁיִם (gershayim, double geresh typographical mark).
Hindi	hi	“...”	‘...’						उद्धरण चिह्न (uddharan chihn)	
Hungarian	hu	„...”	»...«						„...” idézőjel (quotation mark); »...« belső idézőjel, lúdláb (inner quotation mark, goose feet); ’...’ félidézőjel (half quotation mark, tertiary quotation mark); "..." macskaköröm (cat claws)	The three levels of Hungarian quotation: „...»...’...’...«...”
Icelandic	is	„...“	‚...‘ or ‘...’						tilvitnunarmerki gæsalappir (‘goose feet’)	
Ido	io	« ... »	‘ ... ’						cito-hoketi (quotation hooks)	
Indonesian	id	“...”	‘...’		”...”	’...’			tanda kutip, tanda petik (quote mark)	Usage of alternative marks seen among the literature by Jehovah’s Witnesses in Indonesian.
Interlingua	ia	“...”	‘...’						virgulettas (small commas)	
Irish	ga	“...”	‘...’					1–2 pt	liamóg (William)	
Italian	it	«...»	“...”		“...”	‘...’			virgolette (small commas)	
Japanese	ja	「...」; 「...」	『...』; 『...』					Fullwidth form	「...」 鉤括弧 (kagi kakko; hook bracket); 『...』 二重鉤括弧 (nijū kagi kakko; double hook bracket)	Occasionally, other symbols, such as “...”, are used stylistically. Quotes are almost always followed by particle と.
Kazakh	kk	«...»	„...“		“...”				тырнақша (tyrnaqşa)	
Karakalpak	kaa	«...»			“...”				tırnaqsha (tırnaqsha)	
Khmer	km	«...»		(Note: Inferred from keyboard layout and fonts.)	“...”				សញ្ញាសម្រង់ (saññā samráng, quotation mark)	
Korean, North Korea	ko_KP	《...》	〈...〉						〈...〉 홑화살괄호 (hot'hwasalkwalho, arrow bracket); 《...》 겹화살괄호 (kyŏp'hwasalkwalho, double arrow bracket)	
Korean, South Korea	ko_KR	“...”	‘...’		『...』	「...」			“...” 쌍따옴표 (ssang-ttaompyo, double quotation mark); ‘...’ 따옴표 (ttaompyo, quotation mark); 「...」 낫표 (natpyo, sickle symbol); 『...』 겹낫표 (gyeomnatpyo, double sickle symbol)	
Lao	lo	“...”							ວົງຢືມ (vong yum)	
Latvian	lv	“...”; „...”			«...»				“...” / „...” pēdiņas; «...» stūrainās pēdiņas	
Lithuanian	lt	„...“	‚...‘						kabutės	
Lojban	jbo	lu ... li’u			lu “...” li’u				Double quotes are not officially named in Lojban, but sometimes called lubu, following the same pattern as vowel letters, e.g. ⟨a⟩ = abu	Lojban uses the words lu and li’u, rather than punctuation, to surround quotes of grammatically correct Lojban. Double quotes can also be used for aesthetic purposes. Non-Lojban text may be quoted using zoi.
Macedonian	mk	„...“	’...‘						„...“ наводници (navodnitsi, double quote); ’...‘ полунаводници (polunavodnitsi, single quote)	
Maltese	mt	“...”	‘...’						Virgoletti	
Mongolian, Cyrillic script	mn	«...»	„...“		„...“					
Mongolian, Mongolian script	mn	⟪...⟫	⟨...⟩	(Note: Direction of text is vertical.)						
New Tai Lue	khb	《...》	〈...〉							
Norwegian	no	«...»	‘...’		„...“	,...‘			anførselstegn (quotation marks); gåseauge, gåseøyne (goose eyes); hermeteikn, hermetegn; sitatteikn, sitattegn; dobbeltfnutt	
Occitan	oc	«...»	“...”		“...”	«...»			guilheumets, verguetas	
Pashto	ps	«...»								
Persian	fa	«...»							گیومه (giyume, guillaume)	
Polish	pl	„...”	»...«		«...» (Note: In the scientific works as definitions and in literature)	‘...’ (Note: Tertiary quotation mark (very rare) and in the scientific works as definitions)		none	cudzysłów (someone else's word)	
Portuguese, Brazil	pt_BR	“...”	‘...’						aspas (quotation marks); aspas duplas (double quotation marks); aspas simples (single quotation marks); “...” aspas curvas, aspas inglesas, aspas altas, aspas levantadas, aspas elevadas (curved quotation marks); «...» aspas angulares, aspas latinas, vírgulas dobradas, aspas em linha (angular quotation marks)	
Portuguese, Portugal	pt_PT	«...»	“...”		“...”	‘...’			aspas (quotation marks); aspas duplas (double quotation marks); aspas simples (single quotation marks); “...” aspas curvas, aspas inglesas, aspas altas, aspas levantadas, aspas elevadas (curved quotation marks); «...» aspas angulares, aspas latinas, vírgulas dobradas, aspas em linha (angular quotation marks)	
Romanian	ro	„...”	«...»					none	ghilimele (quotes)	
Romansh	rm	«...»	‹...›							
Russian	ru	«...»	„...“		“...”	‘...’		none	кавычки (kavychki); «...» ёлочки (yolochki, little spruces); „...“ лапки (lapki, little paws)	
Serbian	sr	„...”	’...’		„...“	‘...’			„...” наводници (navodnici), знаци навода (znaci navoda); ’...’ полунаводници (polunavodnici)	
Scottish Gaelic	gd	‘...’	“...”		“...”	‘...’			cromagan turrach	
Slovak	sk	„...“	‚...‘		»...«	›...‹			úvodzovky (introduce)	
Slovene	sl	„...“	‚...‘		»...«	›...‹			navednice	
Sorbian	wen hsb dsb	„...“	‚...‘							
Spanish	es	«...»	“...”		“...”	‘...’			comillas; «...» comillas latinas, comillas angulares; “...” comillas inglesas dobles; ‘...’ comillas inglesas simples	
Spanish, Latin America	es-419	“...”	‘...’		“...”	«...»			comillas; “...” comillas inglesas dobles; ‘...’ comillas inglesas simples; «...» comillas angulares, comillas latinas	
Swedish	sv	”...”	’...’		»...»; »...«	’...’			citationstecken, anföringstecken; citattecken (modern term); dubbelfnutt (ASCII double quote); kaninöron (bunny ears)	
Tai Le	tdd	《...》	〈...〉							
Tibetan	bo	《...》	〈...〉							
Tigrinya	ti	«...»	‹...›		“...”	‘...’				
Thai	th	“...”	‘...’						อัญประกาศ (anyaprakat, differentiating mark), ฟันหนู (fạnh̄nū, mouse teeth)	
Turkish	tr	“...”	‘...’		«...»	‹...›		0–1 pt	tırnak işareti (fingernail mark)	
Ukrainian	uk	«...»	“...”; „...“		„...”		(Note: Handwriting.)	none	лапки (lapky, little paws)	
Urdu	ur	“...”	‘...’						واوین (wāwain)	
Uyghur	ug	«...»	‹...›					none	قوش تىرناق (qosh tirnaq); يالاڭ تىرناق (yalang tirnaq)	
Uzbek	uz	«...» (Cyrillic) “...” (Latin)	„...“ (Cyrillic) ‘...’ (Latin)		„...“	‚...‘			qoʻshtirnoq (nails)	
Vietnamese	vi	“...”			« ... »			NBSP (optional)	dấu ngoặc kép (paired parentheses); dấu nháy kép (paired blinking marks)	
Welsh	cy	‘...’	“...”		“...”	‘...’		1–2 pt	dyfynodau	

== Specific language features ==
=== Bulgarian ===
Contemporary Bulgarian employs the em dash or the quotation dash (the horizontal bar) followed by a space character at the beginning of each direct-speech segment by a different character in order to mark direct speech in prose and in most journalistic question and answer interviews; in such cases, the use of standard quotation marks is left for in-text citations or to mark the names of institutions, companies, and sometimes also brand or model names.

Air quotes are also widely used in face-to-face communication in contemporary Bulgarian but usually resemble " ... " (secondary: ' ... ') unlike written Bulgarian quotation marks.

=== Dutch ===
The standard form in the preceding table is taught in schools and used in handwriting. Most large newspapers have kept these low-high quotation marks, „ and ”; otherwise, the alternative form with single or double English-style quotes is now often the only form seen in printed matter. Neutral (straight) quotation marks, " and ', are used widely, especially in texts typed on computers and on websites.

Although not generally common in the Netherlands any more, double angle (guillemet) quotation marks are still sometimes used in Belgium. Examples include the Flemish HUMO magazine and the Metro newspaper in Brussels.

=== German ===
Different forms of German and English quotation marks and similar looking signs

The symbol used as the left (typographical) quote in English is used as the right quote in Germany and Austria and a "low double comma" „ (not used in English) is used for the left quote. Its single quote form ‚ looks like a comma.

Samples	Unicode (decimal)	HTML	Description	Wrong Symbols
‚A‘	U+201A (8218); U+2018 (8216)	&sbquo; &lsquo;	German single quotes (left and right)	, – comma (U + 002C) left; ' – apostrophe (U+0027) right
„A“	U+201E (8222); U+201C (8220)	&bdquo; &ldquo;	German double quotes (left and right)	" – neutral (vertical) double quotes (U+0022)

Some fonts, e.g. Verdana, were not designed with the flexibility to use an English left quote as a German right quote. Such fonts are therefore typographically incompatible with this German usage.

Double quotes are standard for denoting speech in German.

Andreas fragte mich: „Hast du den Artikel ‚EU-Erweiterung‘ gelesen?“ (Andreas asked me: "Have you read the 'EU Expansion' article?")

This style of quoting is also used in Bulgarian, Czech, Danish, Estonian, Georgian, Icelandic, Latvian, Lithuanian, Russian, Serbo-Croatian, Slovak, Slovene and in Ukrainian. In Bulgarian, Icelandic, Estonian, Lithuanian, and Russian, single quotation marks are not used.

Sometimes, especially in novels, guillemets (angled quotation marks) are used in Germany and Austria (but pointing in the opposite direction compared to French): »A ›B‹?«

Andreas fragte mich: »Hast du den Artikel ›EU-Erweiterung‹ gelesen?«
Andreas asked me: "Have you read the 'EU Expansion' article?"

In Switzerland, the French-style angle quotation mark sets are also used for German printed text: «A ‹B›?»

Andreas fragte mich: «Hast du den Artikel ‹EU-Erweiterung› gelesen?»
Andreas asked me: 'Have you read the "EU Expansion" article?'

=== Finnish and Swedish ===
In Finnish and Swedish, right quotes, called citation marks, ”...”, are used to mark both the beginning and the end of a quote. Double right-pointing angular quotes, »...», can also be used.

Alternatively, an en-dash followed by a (non-breaking) space can be used to denote the beginning of quoted speech, in which case the end of the quotation is not specifically denoted (see section Quotation dash below). A line-break should not be allowed between the en-dash and the first word of the quotation.

Samples	Unicode (decimal)	HTML	Description
’A’	U+2019 (8217)	&rsquo;	Secondary level quotation
”A”	U+201D (8221)	&rdquo;	Primary level quotation
»A»	U+00BB (187)	&raquo;	Alternative primary level quotation
– A	U+2013 (8211)	&ndash;	Alternative denotation at the beginning of quoted speech

=== French ===
French uses angle quotation marks (guillemets, or duck-foot quotes):

« Voulez-vous un sandwich, Henri ? »
“Would you like a sandwich, Henri?”

The interior spacing varies depending on the style guide. Standard French, Belgian, and Canadian usage prescribes a non-breaking space inside the guillemets, while Swiss usage is a narrow non-breaking space. In running text, the guillemets are always surrounded by regular spaces.

Sample	Unicode HTML		Description
Sample	Quote	Space	Description
« A »	U+00AB « LEFT-POINTING DOUBLE ANGLE QUOTATION MARK (&laquo;); U+00BB » RIGHT-POINTING DOUBLE ANGLE QUOTATION MARK (&raquo;)	U+00A0 NO-BREAK SPACE (&nbsp;, &NonBreakingSpace;)	French double angle quotes (left and right), legacy (approximative) spacing usual on the web, with normal (four per em) no-break space (justifying, thus inappropriate)
« A »	U+00AB « LEFT-POINTING DOUBLE ANGLE QUOTATION MARK (&laquo;); U+00BB » RIGHT-POINTING DOUBLE ANGLE QUOTATION MARK (&raquo;)	U+202F NARROW NO-BREAK SPACE	French double angle quotes (left and right), correct spacing used by typographers, with narrow (six per em) non-breaking spaces, represented on the web using narrow no-break space
«A»	U+00AB « LEFT-POINTING DOUBLE ANGLE QUOTATION MARK (&laquo;); U+00BB » RIGHT-POINTING DOUBLE ANGLE QUOTATION MARK (&raquo;)		French double angle quotes (left and right) without space (not recommended in French)
‹ A ›	U+2039 ‹ SINGLE LEFT-POINTING ANGLE QUOTATION MARK (&lsaquo;); U+203A › SINGLE RIGHT-POINTING ANGLE QUOTATION MARK (&rsaquo;)	U+00A0 NO-BREAK SPACE (&nbsp;, &NonBreakingSpace;)	French single angle quotes (left and right), alternate form for embedded quotations, legacy (approximative) spacing usual on the web, with normal (four per em) no-break space (justifying, thus inappropriate)
‹ A ›	U+2039 ‹ SINGLE LEFT-POINTING ANGLE QUOTATION MARK (&lsaquo;); U+203A › SINGLE RIGHT-POINTING ANGLE QUOTATION MARK (&rsaquo;)	U+202F NARROW NO-BREAK SPACE	French single angle quotes (left and right), alternate form for embedded quotations, correct spacing used by typographers, with narrow (six per em) non-breaking spaces, represented on the web using narrow no-break space
‹A›	U+2039 ‹ SINGLE LEFT-POINTING ANGLE QUOTATION MARK (&lsaquo;); U+203A › SINGLE RIGHT-POINTING ANGLE QUOTATION MARK (&rsaquo;)		French single angle quotes (left and right) without space (not recommended in French)

For nested citations, usage varies. French style recommends continuing to use double quotation marks, and omitting redundant closing quotes:

« Henri m'a dit « Viens maintenant ! »

Guillemets by the Imprimerie nationale in Bulletin de l’Agence générale des colonies, No. 302, Mai 1934, showing the comma-shaped symbols sitting on the baseline

==== History ====
Initially, the French guillemets were not angle shaped but also used the comma (6/9) shape. They were different from English quotes because they were standing (like today's guillemets) on the baseline (like lowercase letters), not raised above it (like apostrophes and English quotation marks) or hanging below it (like commas). At the beginning of the nineteenth century, this shape evolved to look like (( small parentheses )). The angle shape was introduced later to make them easier to distinguish from apostrophes, commas and parentheses in handwritten manuscripts submitted to publishers. Unicode currently does not provide alternate codes for these 6/9 guillemets on the baseline, as they are considered to be form variants of guillemets, implemented in older French typography (such as the Didot font design). With this older style there was also not necessarily any distinction of shape between the opening and closing guillemets; both often pointed to the right (as today's French closing guillemets do).

In old-style printed books, when quotations span multiple lines of text (including multiple paragraphs), an additional closing quotation sign is traditionally used at the beginning of each line continuing a quotation; this right-pointing guillemet at the beginning of a line does not close the current quotation. This convention was consistently used from the beginning of the 19th century by most book printers, but is no longer in use today. Such insertion of continuation quotation marks was rigidly maintained, even at a word hyphenation break. Since these continuation marks are obsolete in French, there is no support for automatic insertion of continuation guillemets in HTML or CSS, nor in word-processors. Old-style typesetting is emulated by breaking up the final layout with manual line breaks, and inserting the quotation marks at line start, much like angle brackets before quoted plain text e-mail:

« C’est une belle journée pour les Montréalais, soutient
» le ministre. Ces investissements stimuleront la crois-
» sance économique. »

Unlike English, French does not identify unquoted material within a quotation by using a second set of quotation marks. Compare:

« C’est une belle journée pour les Montréalais, soutient le ministre. Ces investissements stimuleront la croissance économique. »
"This is a great day for Montrealers", the minister maintained. "These investments will stimulate economic growth."

For clarity, some newspapers put nested quoted material in italics:

« C’est une belle journée pour les Montréalais, soutient le ministre. Ces investissements stimuleront la croissance économique. »

The French Imprimerie nationale (cf. Lexique des règles typographiques en usage à l'Imprimerie nationale, presses de l'Imprimerie nationale, Paris, 2002) does not use different quotation marks for nesting quotes:

« Son « explication » n’est qu’un mensonge », s’indigna le député.
"His 'explanation' is just a lie", the deputy protested.

In this case, when there should be two adjacent opening or closing marks, only one is written:

Il répondit : « Ce n’est qu’un « gadget ! ».
He answered: "It's only a 'gizmo'."

The use of English quotation marks is increasing in French and usually follows English rules, for instance in situations when the keyboard or the software context doesn't allow the use of guillemets. The French news site L'Humanité uses straight quotation marks along with angle ones.

English quotes are also used sometimes for nested quotations:

« Son “explication” n’est qu’un mensonge », s’indigna le député.
"His 'explanation' is just a lie", the deputy protested.

But the most frequent convention used in printed books for nested quotations is to style them in italics. Single quotation marks are much more rarely used, and multiple levels of quotations using the same marks is often considered confusing for readers:

« Son explication n’est qu’un mensonge », s’indigna le député.
Il répondit : « Ce n’est qu’un gadget ! ».

Further, running dialogue does not use quotation marks beyond the first sentence, as changes in speaker are indicated by a dash, as opposed to the English use of closing and re-opening the quotation. (For other languages employing dashes, see section Quotation dash below.) The dashes may be used entirely without quotation marks as well. In general, quotation marks are extended to encompass as much speech as possible, including not just unspoken text such as "he said" (as previously noted), but also as long as the conversion extends. The quotation marks end at the last word of spoken text (rather than extending to the end of the paragraph) when the final part is not spoken.

« Je ne vous parle pas, monsieur, dit-il.

— Mais je vous parle, moi ! » s’écria le jeune homme exaspéré de ce mélange d’insolence et de bonnes manières, de convenance et de dédain. (Dumas, Les trois mousquetaires)

"I am not speaking to you, sir", he said.

"But I am speaking to you!" cried the young man, exasperated by this combination of insolence and good manners, of protocol and disdain.

=== Greek ===
Greek uses angled quotation marks (εισαγωγικά – isagogiká):

«Μιλάει σοβαρά;» ρώτησε την Μαρία.
«Ναι, σίγουρα», αποκρίθηκε.

and the quotation dash (παύλα – pávla):

― Μιλάει σοβαρά; ρώτησε την Μαρία.
― Ναι, σίγουρα, αποκρίθηκε.

which translate to:

"Is he serious?" he asked Maria.
"Yes, certainly," she replied.

A closing quotation mark, », is added to the beginning of each new paragraph within a quotation.

« Η Βικιπαίδεια ή Wikipedia είναι ένα συλλογικό εγκυκλοπαιδικό
» εγχείρημα που έχει συσταθεί στο Διαδίκτυο, παγκόσμιο, πολύγλωσσο,
» που λειτουργεί με την αρχή του wiki. »

When quotations are nested, the nested parts use English-style quotation marks, double and then (if necessary) single: «...“...‘...’...”...».

Samples	Unicode (decimal)	HTML	Description
«Α»	U+00AB (0171); U+00BB (0187)	&laquo; &raquo;	Greek first level double quotes (εισαγωγικά)
― Α	U+2014 (8212)	&mdash;	Greek direct quotation em-dash

=== Hungarian ===
According to current recommendation by the Hungarian Academy of Sciences the main Hungarian quotation marks are comma-shaped double quotation marks set on the base-line at the beginning of the quote and at apostrophe-height at the end of it for first level, („Quote”), reversed »French quotes« without space (the German tradition) for the second level, and thus the following nested quotation pattern emerges:

- „Quote »inside« quote”

... and with third level:

- „Quote »inside ’inside of inside’ inside« quote”

In Hungarian linguistic tradition the meaning of a word is signified by uniform (unpaired) apostrophe-shaped quotation marks:

- die Biene ’méh’

A quotation dash is also used, and is predominant in belletristic literature.

- – Merre jártál? – kérdezte a köpcös.

Samples	Unicode (decimal)	HTML	Description
„A”	U+201E (8222); U+201D (8221)	&bdquo; &rdquo;	Hungarian first level double quotes (left and right)
»A«	U+00BB (0171); U+00AB (0187)	&raquo; &laquo;	Hungarian second level double quotes (left and right)
’A’	U+2019 (8217)	&rsquo;	Hungarian unpaired quotes signifying "meaning of the preceding term"

=== Hebrew ===
In Israel, the traditional practice in printing and handwriting is to use „low-high” quote marks. Since the 2000s, the plain quotes have become more common. The 2013 revision of the SI-1452 standard for Hebrew keyboard, available since 2012 in Windows 8 and in desktop Linux systems, supports both systems, as does the Gboard keyboard for touchscreen devices.

=== Norwegian ===
Norwegian uses angled quotation marks (Anførselstegn)

Samples	Unicode (decimal)	HTML	Description
«Α»	U+00AB (0171); U+00BB (0187)	&laquo; &raquo;	

=== Polish ===
According to current PN-83/P-55366 standard from 1983 (but not dictionaries, see below), Typesetting rules for composing Polish text (Zasady składania tekstów w języku polskim) one can use either „ordinary Polish quotes” or «French quotes» (without space) for first level, and ‚single Polish quotes’ or «French quotes» for second level, which gives three styles of nested quotes:

1. „Quote ‚inside’ quote”
2. „Quote «inside» quote”
3. «Quote ‚inside’ quote»

There is no space on the internal side of quote marks, with the exception of 1/4 firet (≈ 1/4 em) space between two quotation marks when there are no other characters between them (e.g. ,„ and ’”).

The above rules have not changed since at least the previous BN-76/7440-02 standard from 1976 and are probably much older.

These rules on the use of guillemets conflict with the ones given by Polish dictionaries, including the Wielki Słownik Ortograficzny PWN recommended by the Polish Language Council. The PWN rules state:

In specific uses, guillemets also appear. Guillemet marks pointing inwards are used for highlights and in case a quotation occurs inside a quotation. Guillemet marks pointing outwards are used for definitions (mainly in scientific publications and dictionaries), as well as for enclosing spoken lines and indirect speech, especially in poetic texts.

In Polish printed books and publications, this dictionary-recommended style for guillemets (also known as »German quotes«) is used almost exclusively. In addition to being standard for second level quotes, guillemet quotes are sometimes used as first level quotes in headings and titles, but almost never for ordinary text in paragraphs.

Another style of quoting is to use an em-dash to open a quote; this is used almost exclusively for quoting dialogues rather than for single statements, and is virtually always the one used for that purpose in works of fiction.

Mag skłonił się. Biały kot śpiący obok paleniska ocknął się nagle i spojrzał na niego badawczo.

— Jak się nazywa ta wieś, panie? — zapytał przybysz. Kowal wzruszył ramionami.
— Głupi Osioł.
— Głupi...?
— Osioł — powtórzył kowal takim tonem, jakby wyzywał gościa, żeby spróbował sobie z niego zażartować. Mag zamyślił się.
— Ta nazwa ma pewnie swoją historię — stwierdził w końcu. — W innych okolicznościach chętnie bym jej wysłuchał. Ale chciałbym porozmawiać z tobą, kowalu, o twoim synu.

The wizard bowed. A white cat that had been sleeping by the furnace woke up and watched him carefully.
“What is the name of this place, sir?” said the wizard.
The blacksmith shrugged.
“Stupid Donkey,” he said. [original English version is "Bad Ass", but that's not a common phrase in Polish]
“Stupid—?”
“Donkey,” repeated the blacksmith, his tone defying anyone to make something of it.
The wizard considered this.
“A name with a story behind it,” he said at last, “which were circumstances otherwise I would be pleased to hear. But I would like to speak to you, smith, about your son.”

(— Terry Pratchett, Equal Rites)

An en-dash is sometimes used in place of the em-dash, especially so in newspaper texts.

Samples	Unicode (decimal)	HTML	Description
‚A’	U+201A (8218); U+2019 (8217)	&sbquo; &rsquo;	Polish single quotes (left and right)
„A”	U+201E (8222); U+201D (8221)	&bdquo; &rdquo;	Polish double quotes (left and right)
— A	U+2014 (8212)	&mdash;	Polish direct quotation em-dash
– A	U+2013 (8211)	&ndash;	Polish direct quotation en-dash

=== Portuguese ===
Neither the Portuguese language regulator nor the Brazilian prescribe a particular shape for quotation marks, they only prescribe when and how they should be used.

In Portugal, angular quotation marks (ex. «quote») are traditionally used. They are the Latin tradition quotation marks, normally used by typographers, and are also the usual style in reference sources, as well as on some websites dedicated to the Portuguese language.

The Código de Redação for Portuguese-language documents published in the European Union prescribes three levels of quotation marks, «...“...‘...’...”...»:

E estava escrito «Alguém perguntou “Quem foi que gritou ‘Meu Deus!’?”.» na folha de papel.
And it was written “Someone asked ‘Who shouted “My God!”?’.” on the sheet of paper.
- in black: main sentence which contains the quotations;
- in green: 1st level quotation;
- in red: 2nd level quotation;
- in blue: 3rd level quotation;

The usage of curved quotation marks (ex. “quote” and ‘quote’) is growing in Portugal, probably due to the omnipresence of the English language and to the corresponding difficulty (or even inability) to enter angular quotation marks on some machines (mobile phones, cash registers, calculators, etc.).

In Brazil, angular quotation marks are rare, and curved quotation marks (“quote” and ‘quote’) are almost always used. An example of this can be seen in the difference between a Portuguese keyboard (which has a key for « and ») and a Brazilian keyboard.

The Portuguese-speaking African countries tend to follow Portugal's conventions, not the Brazilian ones.

Other usages of quotation marks (“quote„ for double, ‹quote› for single) are obsolete in Portuguese..

=== Belarusian, Russian, and Ukrainian ===
In Belarusian, Russian, and Ukrainian, the angled quotation marks (Belarusian: «двукоссе», Russian: «кавычки», Ukrainian: «лапки») are used without spaces. In case of quoted material inside a quotation, rules and most noted style manuals prescribe the use of different kinds of quotation marks.

Example in Russian:

Пушкин писал Дельвигу: «Жду „Цыганов“ и тотчас тисну».

(Pushkin wrote to Delvig: "Waiting for 'Gypsies', and publish at once.")

Example in Ukrainian:

«І, звісно, не обійтись без користування словником. Один мій знайомий поет і літературознавець якось жартуючи сказав: “Я волію читати словники, ніж поеми. У словнику ті самі слова, що і в поемі, але подані в систематизованому порядку”. Це сказано жартома, але “читати словники” — не така вже дивовижна і дивацька річ, як може здатися».

("And, of course, you can't avoid using a dictionary. One of my acquaintances, a poet and literary critic, once jokingly said: 'I prefer to read dictionaries than poems. The dictionary has the same words as in the poem, but is presented in a systematic way'. It's a joke, but 'reading dictionaries' is not as amazing and bizarre as it may seem.")

Russian keyboard layout has no angled quotation marks, but has English quotation marks (" ") that are not even supposed to be used in Russian. For that reason one may often see non-standard use of English quotation marks on the Russian web.

=== Spanish ===
==== Spain ====
Spain uses angled quotation marks (comillas españolas, comillas latinas or angulares), with no space between the quotation mark and the quoted material.

«Esto es un ejemplo de cómo se suele hacer una cita literal en español».
"This is an example of how a literal quotation is usually written in Spanish."

When quotations are nested in more levels than inner and outer quotation, the system is:

«Antonio me dijo: “Vaya ‘cacharro’ que se ha comprado Julián”».
"Antonio told me, 'What a piece of "junk" Julián has purchased for himself'".

The use of English quotation marks is increasing in Spanish; the El País style guide, which is widely followed in Spain, recommends them. Hispanic Americans often use them, owing to influence from the United States.

==== Latin America and the Caribbean ====
Latin America and the Caribbean uses the English quotation marks double (“ ”) and single (‘ ’) due to influencing from the United States, despite the RAE recommends of the usage of the angled quotation marks (« »), angled can be used as alternative.

“Esto es un ejemplo de cómo se suele hacer una cita literal en español latinoamericano.”
"This is an example of how a literal quotation is usually written in Latin American Spanish."

Unlike Spain, Latin America uses a distinct order according to AML (Academia Mexicana de la Lengua).

“Juliana ayer me dijo: ‘Que pedazo de «cacharro» que se compró Lautaro’”.
"Juliana told me yesterday, 'What a piece of "scrap" Lautaro has purchased for himself'".

Some exceptions that in Caribbean, parts of French uses angled quotation marks, parts of Spanish (e. g. Dominican Republic) uses English ones.

=== Chinese, Japanese and Korean ===
Corner brackets are well-suited for Chinese, Japanese, and Korean because they accommodate vertical and horizontal writing equally well. China, South Korea, and Japan all use corner brackets when writing vertically. Usage differs when writing horizontally:

- In Japan, corner brackets are used.
- In South Korea, corner brackets and English-style quotes are used.
- In North Korea, angle quotes are used.
- In mainland China, English-style quotes (full width “ ”) are official and prevalent; corner brackets are rare today. The Unicode code points used are the English quotes (rendered as fullwidth by the font), not the fullwidth forms.
- In Taiwan, Hong Kong and Macau, where traditional characters are used, corner brackets are prevalent, although English-style quotes are also used.
- In the Chinese language, double angle brackets are placed around titles of books, documents, movies, pieces of art or music, magazines, newspapers, laws, etc. When nested, single angle brackets are used inside double angle brackets. With some exceptions, this usage parallels the usage of italics in English:

「你看過《三國演義》嗎？」他問我。
"Have you read Romance of the Three Kingdoms?", he asked me.

When corner brackets are being used for quotations, quote-within-quote segments are marked with white corner brackets.

Samples	Unicode (decimal)	HTML	Description	Usage
「文字」	U+300C (12300); U+300D (12301)	&#x300C; &#x300D;	Corner brackets: Chinese: 單引號 (dān yǐn hào); Japanese: 鉤括弧 (kagikakko); Korean: 낫표 (natpyo)	Japanese; Korean (titles of papers, articles, short stories); Traditional Chinese
﹁文字﹂	U+FE41 (65089); U+FE42 (65090); (non-normative) (Note: These codes for vertical-writing characters are for presentation forms in the Unicode CJK compatibility forms section. Typical documents use normative character codes which are shown for the horizontal writing in this table, and applications are usually responsible to render correct forms depending on the writing direction used.)	&#xFE41; &#xFE42;	Corner brackets: Chinese: 單引號 (dān yǐn hào); Japanese: 鉤括弧 (kagikakko); Korean: 낫표 (natpyo)	For vertical writing: Japanese; Korean; Traditional Chinese; Simplified Chinese
『文字』	U+300E (12302); U+300F (12303)	&#x300E; &#x300F;	White corner brackets: Chinese: 雙引號 (shuāng yǐn hào); Japanese: 二重鉤括弧 (nijū kagikakko); Korean: 겹낫표 (gyeomnatpyo)	Japanese; Korean (titles of books); Traditional Chinese
﹃文字﹄	U+FE43 (65091); U+FE44 (65092); (non-normative)	&#xFE43; &#xFE44;	White corner brackets: Chinese: 雙引號 (shuāng yǐn hào); Japanese: 二重鉤括弧 (nijū kagikakko); Korean: 겹낫표 (gyeomnatpyo)	For vertical writing: Japanese; Korean; Traditional Chinese; Simplified Chinese
“한”	U+201C (8220); U+201D (8221)	&ldquo; &rdquo;	Double quotation marks: Korean: 큰따옴표 (keunttaompyo); Chinese: 雙引號 (shuāng yǐn hào)	Korean (South Korea); Traditional Chinese (acceptable but less common, happened in Hong Kong mainly as a result of influence from mainland China); Simplified Chinese
‘한’	U+2018 (8216); U+2019 (8217)	&lsquo; &rsquo;	Single quotation marks: Korean: 작은따옴표 (jageunttaompyo); Chinese: 單引號 (dān yǐn hào)	Korean (South Korea); Chinese (for quote-within-quote segments)
《한》	U+300A (12298); U+300B (12299)	&#x300A; &#x300B;	Double angle brackets: Korean: 겹화살괄호 (gyeophwasalgwalho); Chinese: 書名號 (shū míng hào)	Korean (titles of newspapers, magazines, periodicals); Chinese (used for titles of books, documents, movies, pieces of art or music, magazines, newspapers, laws, etc. )
〈한〉	U+3008 (12296); U+3009 (12297)	&#x3008; &#x3009;	Single angle brackets: Korean: 홑화살괄호 (hothwasalgwalho); Chinese: 書名號 (shū míng hào)	Korean (sub-titles of books, titles of movies, plays, art); Chinese (for book titles within book titles.)

== Quotation dash ==
Another typographical style is to omit quotation marks for lines of dialogue, replacing them with an initial dash, as in lines from James Joyce's Ulysses:

― O saints above! Miss Douce said, sighed above her jumping rose. I wished I hadn't laughed so much. I feel all wet.
― O Miss Douce! Miss Kennedy protested. You horrid thing!

This style is particularly common in Bulgarian, French, Greek, Hungarian, Polish, Portuguese, Romanian, Russian, Spanish, Swedish, Turkish, and Vietnamese.

In Finnish, the beginning of a reporting clause is marked only by the punctuation already existing in the sentence, or (if there was none) by adding a comma. When a quote continues after the reporting clause, the clause ends with a comma, and the continuation begins with another dash:

Finnish example	– Et sinä ole paljon minkään näköinen, sanoi Korkala melkein surullisesti, – mutta ei auta.
English translation	"You don't seem to be anything special," said Korkala almost sadly, "but there's no help to it."
English translation formatted in Finnish quotation style	– You don't seem to be anything special, said Korkala almost sadly, – but there's no help to it.
Finnish example	– Frakki, älähti Huikari. – Missä on frakki? – Räätälissä, sanoi Joonas rauhallisesti.
English translation	"Tailcoat", yelped Huikari. "Where is the tailcoat?" "At the tailor's", said Joonas calmly.
English translation formatted in Finnish quotation style	– Tailcoat, yelped Huikari. – Where is the tailcoat? – At the tailor's, said Joonas calmly.

The Unicode standard introduced a separate character U+2015 ― HORIZONTAL BAR to be used as a quotation dash.

== Electronic documents ==
Different typefaces, character encodings and computer languages use various encodings and glyphs for quotation marks.

=== Typewriters and early computers ===
On most keyboards, typographical quotation marks are absent.

When typewriter keyboards were designed, curved quotation marks were not implemented. Instead, to limit the number of characters (and keys) required, straight quotation marks were invented as a compromise. At that time typesetting did use curved quotation marks. The ASCII character set, which has been used on a wide variety of computers since the 1960s, contains the straight versions only (U+0027 ' APOSTROPHE and U+0022 " QUOTATION MARK). All other forms of quotation marks, such as angled, lowered, inverted, were not provided by British or American typewriters.

Many systems, such as the personal computers of the 1980s and early 1990s, actually drew these ASCII quotes like closing quotes (or primes) on-screen and in printouts, so text would appear like this (approximately):

″Good morning, Dave,″ said HAL.
′Good morning, Dave,′ said HAL.

These same systems often drew the backtick (the free standing character U+0060 ` GRAVE ACCENT) as an 'open quote' glyph (usually a mirror image so it still sloped in the direction of a grave accent). Using this character as the opening quote gave a typographic approximation of curved single quotes. Nothing similar was available for the double quote, so many people resorted to using two single quotes for double quotes, which would look approximately like the following:

``Good morning, Dave,′′ said HAL.
`Good morning, Dave,′ said HAL.

The typesetting application TeX uses this convention for input files. The following is an example of TeX input which yields proper curly quotation marks.

``Good morning, Dave,'' said HAL.
`Good morning, Dave,' said HAL.

The Unicode standard added codepoints for slanted or curved quotes (U+201C “ LEFT DOUBLE QUOTATION MARK and U+201D ” RIGHT DOUBLE QUOTATION MARK, described further below), shown here for comparison:

“Good morning, Dave,” said HAL.
‘Good morning, Dave,’ said HAL.

The Unicode mapping for PostScript Standard Encoding preserves the typographic approximation convention by mapping its equivalent of ASCII grave and single-quote to the Unicode curly quotation mark characters.

=== Keyboard layouts ===
Early computer keyboards copied layouts that had been established by typewriter keyboards. Most computer keyboards do not have specific keys for curved quotation marks or angled quotation marks. This may also have to do with computer character sets:

- IBM character sets generally do not include curved quotation mark characters, therefore, keys for those marks are absent from most IBM computer keyboards.
- Microsoft followed the example of IBM in its character set and keyboard design. Curved quotation marks were implemented later in Windows character sets, but most Microsoft computer keyboards do not have a dedicated key for the curved quotation mark characters. On keyboards with the Alt Gr key or both the Alt key and the numeric keypad, they are accessible through a series of keystrokes that involve these keys. (Note: Using the numeric keypad, Alt+0145 through Alt+0148 yield, respectively, ‘, ’, “, and ”.) Also, techniques using their Unicode code points are available; see Unicode input.
- Macintosh character sets have always had curved quotation marks available. Nevertheless, these are mostly only accessible through a series of keystrokes involving the ⌥ Opt key.

In languages that use the curved “...” quotation marks, they are available (Note: in 1st or 2nd level access, i.e., specific key or using the ⇧ Shift key; not 3rd or 4th level access, i.e., using Alt Gr key or ⌥ Opt key, in conjunction or not with the ⇧ Shift key.) in:

- Neo

In languages that use angular «...» quotation marks, they are available in:

- Macintosh Arabic keyboard;
- Armenian keyboard
- Canadian keyboard
- French BÉPO keyboard
- Greek keyboard
- Khmer keyboard
- Latvian ergonomic keyboard
- Pashto keyboard
- Persian keyboard
- Portuguese keyboard
- Syriac keyboard
- Uyghur keyboard

In languages that use the corner bracket 「...」 quotation marks, they are available in:

- Japanese keyboard

In languages that use the angle bracket 《...》 (Note: These should be rotated 90 degrees in vertical text.) they are available in:

- Mongolian keyboard
- New Tai Lue keyboard

In languages that use the curved „...“ quotation marks, they are available in:

- Bulgarian keyboard
- Georgian keyboard
- Macedonian keyboard

In languages that use the curved „...” quotation marks, they are available in:

- Romanian Standard SR 13392:2004 keyboard
- Neo

In languages that use the curved ”...” quotation marks, they are available in:

- none

=== Curved quotes within and across applications ===
Historically, support for curved quotes was a problem in information technology, primarily because the widely used ASCII character set did not include a representation for them. (Note: To use non ASCII characters in e-mail and on Usenet the sending mail application generally needs to set a MIME type specifying the encoding. In most cases (the exceptions being if UTF-7 is used or if the 8BITMIME extension is present), this also requires the use of a content-transfer encoding. (Mozilla Thunderbird allows insertion of HTML code such as ‘ and ” to produce typographic quotation marks; see below.))

The term "smart quotes", “...”, is from the name in several word processors of a function aimed this problem: automatically converting straight quotes typed by the user into curved quotes, the feature attempts to be "smart" enough to determine whether the punctuation marked opening or closing. Since curved quotes are the typographically correct ones, word processors have traditionally offered curved quotes to users (at minimum as available characters). Before Unicode was widely accepted and supported, this meant representing the curved quotes in whatever 8-bit encoding the software and underlying operating system was using. The character sets for Windows and Macintosh used two different pairs of values for curved quotes, while ISO 8859-1 (historically the default character set for the Unixes and older Linux systems) has no curved quotes, making cross-platform and cross-application compatibility difficult.

Performance by these "smart quotes" features was far from perfect overall (variance potential by e.g. subject matter, formatting/style convention, user typing habits). As many word processors (including Microsoft Word and OpenOffice.org) have the function enabled by default, users may not have realized that the ASCII-compatible straight quotes they were typing on their keyboards ended up as something different (conversely users could incorrectly assume its functioning in other applications, e.g. composing emails).

The curved apostrophe is the same character as the closing single quote. "Smart quotes" features wrongly convert initial apostrophes (as in 'tis, 'em, 'til, and '89) into opening single quotes. (An example of this error appears in the advertisements for the television show 'Til Death.) The two very different functions of this character can cause confusion, particularly in British styles, (Note: UK English, Scots Gaelic and Welsh as described in the article.) in which single quotes are the standard primary.

Unicode support has since become the norm for operating systems. Thus, in at least some cases, transferring content containing curved quotes (or any other non-ASCII characters) from a word processor to another application or platform has been less troublesome, provided all steps in the process (including the clipboard if applicable) are Unicode-aware. But there are still applications which still use the older character sets, or output data using them, and thus problems still occur.

There are other considerations for including curved quotes in the widely used markup languages HTML, XML, and SGML. If the encoding of the document supports direct representation of the characters, they can be used, but doing so can cause difficulties if the document needs to be edited by someone who is using an editor that cannot support the encoding. For example, many simple text editors only handle a few encodings or assume that the encoding of any file opened is a platform default, so the quote characters may appear as the generic replacement character � or "mojibake" (gibberish). HTML includes a set of entities for curved quotes: &lsquo; (left single), &rsquo; (right single or apostrophe), &sbquo; (low 9 single), &ldquo; (left double), &rdquo; (right double), and &bdquo; (low 9 double). XML does not define these by default, but specifications based on it can do so, and XHTML does. In addition, while the HTML 4, XHTML and XML specifications allow specifying numeric character references in either hexadecimal or decimal, SGML and older versions of HTML (and many old implementations) only support decimal references. Thus, to represent curly quotes in XML and SGML, it is safest to use the decimal numeric character references. That is, to represent the double curly quotes use &#8220; and &#8221;, and to represent single curly quotes use &#8216; and &#8217;. Both numeric and named references function correctly in almost every modern browser. While using numeric references can make a page more compatible with outdated browsers, using named references are safer for systems that handle multiple character encodings (i.e. RSS aggregators and search results).

In Windows file and folder names, the straight double quotation mark is prohibited, as it is a reserved character. The curved quotation marks, as well as the straight single quotation mark, are permitted.

=== Usenet and email ===
The style of quoting known as Usenet quoting uses the greater-than sign, > prepended to a line of text to mark it as a quote. This convention was later standardized in RFC 3676, and was adopted subsequently by many email clients when automatically including quoted text from previous messages (in plain text mode).

=== Unicode code point table ===
In Unicode, 30 characters are marked Quotation Mark=Yes by character property. They all have general category "Punctuation", and a subcategory Open, Close, Initial, Final or Other (Ps, Pe, Pi, Pf, Po). Several other Unicode characters with quotation mark semantics lack the character property.

Quotation marks in Unicode (Character property "Quotation_Mark"=Yes)
Character	Comments
U+0022 " QUOTATION MARK (&quot;, &QUOT;)	Typewriter ("programmer's") quote, ambidextrous. Also known as "double quote".
U+0027 ' APOSTROPHE (&apos;)	Typewriter ("programmer's") straight single quote, ambidextrous
U+00AB « LEFT-POINTING DOUBLE ANGLE QUOTATION MARK (&laquo;)	Double angle quote (chevron, guillemet, duck-foot quote), left
U+00BB » RIGHT-POINTING DOUBLE ANGLE QUOTATION MARK (&raquo;)	Double angle quote, right
U+2018 ‘ LEFT SINGLE QUOTATION MARK (&lsquo;, &OpenCurlyQuote;)	Single curved quote, left. Also known as inverted comma or turned comma (Note: Also sometimes used by 18th- and 19th-century printers for the small "c" for Scottish names, e.g. M‘Culloch rather than M^{c}Culloch. For a printed example see the Green Bag reference or the Dictionary of Australasian Biography, page 290 (Wikisource).)
U+2019 ’ RIGHT SINGLE QUOTATION MARK (&CloseCurlyQuote;, &rsquo;, &rsquor;)	Single curved quote, right (Note: The same U+2019 code point and glyph is used for typographic (curly) apostrophes. Both U+0027 and U+2019 are ambiguous about distinguishing punctuation from apostrophes.)
U+201A ‚ SINGLE LOW-9 QUOTATION MARK (&lsquor;, &sbquo;)	Low single curved quote, left
U+201B ‛ SINGLE HIGH-REVERSED-9 QUOTATION MARK	also called single reversed comma, quotation mark
U+201C “ LEFT DOUBLE QUOTATION MARK (&ldquo;, &OpenCurlyDoubleQuote;)	Double curved quote, left
U+201D ” RIGHT DOUBLE QUOTATION MARK (&CloseCurlyDoubleQuote;, &rdquo;, &rdquor;)	Double curved quote, right
U+201E „ DOUBLE LOW-9 QUOTATION MARK (&bdquo;, &ldquor;)	Low double curved quote, left
U+201F ‟ DOUBLE HIGH-REVERSED-9 QUOTATION MARK	also called double reversed comma, quotation mark
U+2039 ‹ SINGLE LEFT-POINTING ANGLE QUOTATION MARK (&lsaquo;)	Single angle quote, left
U+203A › SINGLE RIGHT-POINTING ANGLE QUOTATION MARK (&rsaquo;)	Single angle quote, right
U+2E42 ⹂ DOUBLE LOW-REVERSED-9 QUOTATION MARK	also called double low reversed comma, quotation mark
Quotation marks in Miscellaneous Technical
U+231C ⌜ TOP LEFT CORNER (&ulcorn;, &ulcorner;)	jointly, these are also called Quine corners, indicating quasi-quotation or Gödel numerals
U+231D ⌝ TOP RIGHT CORNER (&urcorn;, &urcorner;)	jointly, these are also called Quine corners, indicating quasi-quotation or Gödel numerals
Quotation marks in dingbats
U+275B ❛ HEAVY SINGLE TURNED COMMA QUOTATION MARK ORNAMENT	Quotation Mark=No
U+275C ❜ HEAVY SINGLE COMMA QUOTATION MARK ORNAMENT	Quotation Mark=No
U+275D ❝ HEAVY DOUBLE TURNED COMMA QUOTATION MARK ORNAMENT	Quotation Mark=No
U+275E ❞ HEAVY DOUBLE COMMA QUOTATION MARK ORNAMENT	Quotation Mark=No
U+1F676 🙶 SANS-SERIF HEAVY DOUBLE TURNED COMMA QUOTATION MARK ORNAMENT	Quotation Mark=No
U+1F677 🙷 SANS-SERIF HEAVY DOUBLE COMMA QUOTATION MARK ORNAMENT	Quotation Mark=No
U+1F678 🙸 SANS-SERIF HEAVY LOW DOUBLE COMMA QUOTATION MARK ORNAMENT	Quotation Mark=No
Quotation marks in Braille Patterns
U+2826 ⠦ BRAILLE PATTERN DOTS-236	Braille double closing quotation mark; Quotation Mark=No
U+2834 ⠴ BRAILLE PATTERN DOTS-356	Braille double opening quotation mark; Quotation Mark=No
Quotation marks in Chinese, Japanese, and Korean (CJK)
U+300C 「 LEFT CORNER BRACKET	CJK
U+300D 」 RIGHT CORNER BRACKET	CJK
U+300E 『 LEFT WHITE CORNER BRACKET	CJK
U+300F 』 RIGHT WHITE CORNER BRACKET	CJK
U+301D 〝 REVERSED DOUBLE PRIME QUOTATION MARK	CJK
U+301E 〞 DOUBLE PRIME QUOTATION MARK	CJK
U+301F 〟 LOW DOUBLE PRIME QUOTATION MARK	CJK
Alternate encodings
U+FE41 ﹁ PRESENTATION FORM FOR VERTICAL LEFT CORNER BRACKET	CJK Compatibility Form (vertical form to be used in horizontal texts), preferred use: U+300C
U+FE42 ﹂ PRESENTATION FORM FOR VERTICAL RIGHT CORNER BRACKET	CJK Compatibility Form (vertical form to be used in horizontal texts), preferred use: U+300D
U+FE43 ﹃ PRESENTATION FORM FOR VERTICAL LEFT WHITE CORNER BRACKET	CJK Compatibility Form (vertical form to be used in horizontal texts), preferred use: U+300E
U+FE44 ﹄ PRESENTATION FORM FOR VERTICAL RIGHT WHITE CORNER BRACKET	CJK Compatibility Form (vertical form to be used in horizontal texts), preferred use: U+300F
U+FF02 ＂ FULLWIDTH QUOTATION MARK	Halfwidth and Fullwidth Forms, fullwidth form corresponds with narrow U+0022
U+FF07 ＇ FULLWIDTH APOSTROPHE	Halfwidth and Fullwidth Forms, fullwidth form corresponds with narrow U+0027
U+FF62 ｢ HALFWIDTH LEFT CORNER BRACKET	Halfwidth and Fullwidth Forms, halfwidth form corresponds with wide U+300C
U+FF63 ｣ HALFWIDTH RIGHT CORNER BRACKET	Halfwidth and Fullwidth Forms, halfwidth form corresponds with wide U+300D
