= US keyboard layout =

US keyboard layout may refer to:

- QWERTY, the traditional keyboard layout
- Dvorak, an alternative layout made to make typing easier, sometimes called the American Simplified Keyboard
