= Barbara Blackburn =

Barbara Blackburn may refer to:

- Barbara Blackburn (actress)
- Barbara Blackburn (dog trainer) (1910–1988), TV personality and author
- Barbara Blackburn (typist) (1920–2008), American typist and writer, noted for her fast typing speed
- Barbara Blackburn, wife of writer Jolly Blackburn and inspiration for the character of Sara in Knights of the Dinner Table
