= Typewriting Behavior =

1936 book by August Dvorak, Nellie Merrick, William Dealey and Gertrude Ford

Typewriting Behavior is a book by August Dvorak, Nellie Merrick, William Dealey and Gertrude Ford. It was published in 1936 by the American Book Company. It is currently out of print but can be found in most major libraries.

The book is a study on the psychology of typing. It gives a scientific approach to teaching and learning typewriting, from personalities to patterns and machine effects. It gives an in depth overview on the subject of typing.

This book also introduced the Dvorak Simplified Keyboard.
