= One-hand typing =

The idea of one-hand typing is to touch type using only one hand (e.g. the left one), or mainly one hand. Its history and application are closely related to keyboard research on QWERTY and Dvorak keyboard layouts.

Typing with one hand can be done in a number of ways, and novel approaches are still emerging. People handle this situation in different ways and the solution depends on whether it is necessitated by a temporary condition, as well as the pupil's physical abilities, muscle strength, and cognition and memory. Therefore, existing approaches may fit different expectations.

== Benefits and drawbacks ==
One-handed typing can be useful in situations where one would usually need to move their dominant hand between one's keyboard and mouse or if the typist's hands are otherwise occupied.

A potential drawback of this method is that it can be straining on the typist's hands, which can lead to repetitive strain injury.

== Using standard PC keyboard ==
=== Mirrored keyboard ===
The idea is to only use one hand (preferably the left one) and type the right-hand letters by holding a key which acts as a modifier key. The layout is mirrored, so the use of the muscle memory of the other hand is possible, which greatly reduces the amount of time needed to learn the layout, if the person previously used both hands to type. This was first devised by Edgar Matias et al. in 1996 and later referred to by Randall Munroe on his xkcd blog.

=== Hand home position on FGHJ ===
Using a standard keyboard, the one-handed typist must move from side to side to cover all the keys. Ideally, this typist should keep their main hand on FGHJ, but they will inevitably be forced to leave the home keys or stretch like a concert pianist to reach all the letters. Without using a second hand as an aid (for example, the right shift key), most capital letters require a time-consuming excursion to one side or the other. This reduces efficiency and frustrates the typist.

=== Special keyboard layout ===
Some single-hand keyboard layouts exist, such as the "one-handed Dvorak" and the "left hand Ngaih".

== See also ==
- Chorded keyboard
- QWERTY
- Touch typing
- Human multitasking
- Dvorak Simplified Keyboard
