= Barbara Blackburn (typist) =

American typist (1920–2008)

- Born: Barbara Clay Henley; September 25, 1920; Pleasant Hill, Missouri, U.S.
- Died: April 18, 2008 (aged 87)
- Known for: being the "world's fastest typist" according to the Guinness Book of World Records (later removed)

Barbara Clay Henley Blackburn (September 25, 1920 – April 18, 2008) was an American clerical worker recognized for her claimed fast typing speed using the Dvorak keyboard layout.

The Guinness Book of World Records included her speed records amongst others in the "Typing, Fastest" category of the 1976–1986 editions, where she was listed as able to "attain a speed of 170 wpm" and "maintain 145 wpm for 55 minutes". Guinness's typing speed records for electronic and computer keyboards, including Blackburn's records, were removed from the 1987 edition onwards, citing their accuracy. Blackburn's self-claimed peak speed, in 1986, was 212 words per minute for "a brief time." (Note: Blackburn does not specify over what time period she achieved that 212 wpm peak speed, just that it was "brief". Earlier that same year, in January 1985, she stated that she had recently achieved a new record of 196 wpm, and would be submitting this to Guinness World Records. That figure was never published by Guinness, as Blackburn's record was removed from the Guinness Book of World Records in 1986.)

Blackburn was popularly recognized as the "world's fastest typist" and made media appearances to exhibit her typing speed and the Dvorak layout, notably appearing in a 1985 episode of Late Night with David Letterman and in a television commercial for the Apple IIc.

== Typing ==
Blackburn began typing with the Dvorak keyboard layout in 1938, taking about three weeks to switch to the new layout. She was trained as a simplified keyboard demonstrator while attending Huff Business College in Kansas City. During World War II, according to Blackburn, she was timed by a "Navy girl" to type at 138 wpm on a Royal Standard typewriter with Dvorak keyboard. In 1955 she reported typing 150 wpm. In 1972, Technical Communication reported her typing speed at 150–160 wpm using the Dvorak layout. In 1984, the Chicago Tribune reported her typing speed at 180 wpm on a Dvorak keyboard.

Blackburn was included in the Guinness Book of World Records starting in 1976, where she is credited as "Mrs. Barbara Blackburn of Lee's Summit, Missouri" and in the later years as "of Everett, Wash". Her records were accepted into the book without an official test; a Dvorak layout advocate lobbied on her behalf without her knowledge. According to the Guinness book, Blackburn "can maintain 150 wpm for 50 minutes (37,500 keystrokes) and attains a speed of 170 wpm using the Dvorak Simplified Keyboard". Blackburn's records were removed from the 1986 edition of the book, with Guinness stating that "records on electric and computer-driven typewriters cannot be compared with any accuracy."

The Associated Press reported Blackburn achieving a speed of 194 wpm in October 1984 using the MasterType typing game. In a January 1985 story in the Los Angeles Times, Blackburn said she had recently reached 196 wpm. During her Late Night appearance on January 24, 1985, she claimed to have achieved 170 wpm on minute tests, and 200 wpm using a computer. In May 1985, The Seattle Times reported that Blackburn said she had "attained speeds of 212 words a minute for a brief time" using an Apple computer keyboard and the Dvorak layout.

== Media appearances ==
=== Apple IIc commercial ===
Blackburn starred in a commercial for the Apple IIc, released in 1984, which offered a switchable Dvorak–QWERTY keyboard. In the commercial, captioned as the "World's Fastest Typist", she explains how she achieved the Guinness World Record for fastest typist at barely 150 words a minute, yet she was able to type nearly 200 wpm on an Apple computer.

=== Late Night with David Letterman ===
Blackburn was a guest on the January 24, 1985, episode of Late Night with David Letterman. In the episode, Letterman pitted Blackburn against his production assistant Barbara Gaines. He challenged both to type for a minute on an IBM Selectric, copying from The Official Professional Baseball Rules Book. Afterwards, he presented a paper incomprehensible with typos, claiming it was Blackburn's. Letterman then crowned his production assistant, Gaines, the fastest typist in the world. When Letterman asked what happened, Blackburn claimed the typewriter had been tampered with, as it was functional the day before.

On the January 28, 1985, broadcast, Letterman brought a small panel to figure out what had occurred, implying that Blackburn was a con-artist. A Manhattan Office Products typewriter repairman had inspected the typewriter and claimed it was in good working order. The former secretary of the New York State Polygraph Association claimed Blackburn was stressed during the competition. Finally, a United States Navy lieutenant deciphered Blackburn's typographic errors using a substitution cipher. He explained that the left hand's letters were typed correctly while the right hand's letters had been displaced one key to the right. A footage replay showed that Blackburn had transferred her hand one to the right.

Blackburn felt that she lost her credibility in the comedy routine. According to her family members, Blackburn was very hurt by her experience on Letterman and never watched the episode.

== Personal life ==
Barbara Clay Blackburn (née Henley) was born in Pleasant Hill, Missouri. Blackburn worked for State Farm Insurance in Salem, Oregon, until her retirement in 2001. She died in 2008.

== See also ==
- August Dvorak
