= Dvorak keyboard layout =

Keyboard layout for Latin-script alphabets

The modern Dvorak layout (U.S.)

Dvorak (/ˈdvɔːræk/) is a keyboard layout for Latin-script alphabets. It was patented in 1936 by August Dvorak and his brother-in-law, William Dealey, as a faster and more ergonomic alternative for typing English, compared to the 1874 QWERTY layout (the de facto standard keyboard layout). Dvorak proponents claim that it requires less finger motion and as a result reduces errors, increases typing speed, reduces repetitive strain injuries, or is simply more comfortable than QWERTY.

Dvorak has failed to replace QWERTY as the most common keyboard layout, with the most pointed-to reasons being that QWERTY was popularized 60 years prior to Dvorak's creation, and that Dvorak's advantages are debated and relatively small. However, most major modern operating systems (such as Windows, macOS, Linux, iOS, Android, ChromeOS, and BSD) allow a user to switch to the Dvorak layout. The layout can be chosen for use with any hardware keyboard, regardless of the characters printed on the key caps.

== Overview ==
Dvorak was designed with the belief that it would significantly increase typing speeds with respect to the QWERTY layout by alleviating some of its perceived shortcomings, such as:

- Many common letter combinations require awkward finger motions.
- Some common letter combinations are typed with the same finger. (e.g. "ed" and "de")
- Many common letter combinations require a finger to jump over the home row. (e.g. "minimum")
- Many common letter combinations are typed with one hand while the other sits idle (e.g. was, were).
- Most typing is done with the left hand, which for most people is not the dominant hand.
- About 16% of typing is done on the lower row, 52% on the top row and only 32% on the home row.

August Dvorak studied letter frequencies and the physiology of the hand and created a new layout to alleviate the above problems, based on the following principles:

- Letters should be typed by alternating between hands (which makes typing more rhythmic, increases speed, reduces error, and reduces fatigue). On a Dvorak keyboard, vowels and the most used symbol characters are on the left (with the vowels on the home row), while the most used consonants are on the right, just like how the Korean Dubeolsik layout has the vowel jamo on the right and the consonant jamo on the left.
- For maximum speed and efficiency, the most common letters and bigrams should be typed on the home row, where the fingers rest, and under the strongest fingers. (About 70% of letter keyboard strokes on Dvorak are done on the home row and only 22% and 8% on the top and bottom rows respectively.)
- The least common letters should be on the bottom row which is the hardest row to reach.
- The right hand should do more of the typing because most people are right-handed.
- Bigrams should not be typed with adjacent fingers.
- Stroking should generally move from the edges of the board to the middle. An observation of this principle is that, for many people, when tapping fingers on a table, it is easier going from little finger to index than vice versa. This motion on a keyboard is called inboard stroke flow.

The Dvorak layout is intended for the English language, since other European languages have letter frequencies, letter sequences, and bigrams differing from those of English. Additionally, many languages have letters that do not occur in English. For non-English use, these differences lessen the alleged advantages of the original Dvorak keyboard. However, the Dvorak principles have been applied to the design of keyboards for other languages, though the primary keyboards used by most countries are based on the QWERTY design.

The layout was completed in 1932 and granted U.S. patent 2,040,248 in 1936. The American National Standards Institute (ANSI) designated the Dvorak keyboard as an alternative standard keyboard layout in 1982 (INCITS 207-1991 R2007; previously X4.22-1983, X3.207:1991), "Alternate Keyboard Arrangement for Alphanumeric Machines". The original ANSI Dvorak layout was available as a factory-supplied option on the original IBM Selectric typewriter.

== Features ==
August Dvorak was an educational psychologist and professor of education at the University of Washington in Seattle. Touch typing had come into wide use by that time and Dvorak became interested in the layout while serving as an advisor to Gertrude Ford, who was writing her master's thesis on typing errors. He quickly concluded that the QWERTY layout needed to be replaced, as QWERTY had not been laid out with the pure intention of ease and speed. Dvorak was joined by his brother-in-law William Dealey, a professor of education at the then North Texas State Teacher's College in Denton, Texas.

Dvorak and Dealey's objective was to scientifically design a keyboard to decrease typing errors, speed up typing, and lessen typist fatigue. They engaged in extensive research while designing their keyboard layout. In 1914 and 1915, Dealey attended seminars on the science of motion and later reviewed slow-motion films of typists with Dvorak. Dvorak and Dealey meticulously studied the English language, researching the most used letters and letter combinations. They also studied the physiology of the hand. The result in 1932 was the Dvorak Simplified Keyboard.

In 1893, George Blickensderfer had developed a keyboard layout for the Blickensderfer typewriter model 5 that used the letters DHIATENSOR for the home row. Blickensderfer had determined that 85% of English words contained these letters. The Dvorak keyboard uses the same letters in its home row, apart from replacing R with U, and even keeps the consonants in the same order, but moves the vowels to the left: AOEUIDHTNS.

In 1933, Dvorak started entering typists trained on his keyboard into the International Commercial Schools Contest, which was a typing contest sponsored by typewriter manufacturers consisting of a series of professional and amateur contests. The professional contests had typists sponsored by typewriter companies to advertise their machines.

In the 1930s, the Tacoma, Washington, school district ran an experimental program in typing designed by Dvorak to determine whether to hold Dvorak layout classes. The experiment put 2,700 high school students through Dvorak typing classes and found that students learned Dvorak in one-third the time it took to learn QWERTY. When a new school board was elected, however, it chose to terminate the Dvorak classes. During World War II, while in the Navy, Dvorak conducted experiments which he claimed showed that typists could be retrained to Dvorak in a mere 10 days, though he discarded at least two previous studies which were conducted and whose results are unknown.

With such great apparent gains, interest in the Dvorak keyboard layout increased by the early 1950s. Numerous businesses and government organizations began to consider retraining their typists on Dvorak keyboards. In this environment, the General Services Administration commissioned Earle Strong to determine whether the switch from QWERTY to Dvorak should be made. After retraining a selection of typists from QWERTY to Dvorak, once the Dvorak group had regained their previous typing speed (which took 100 hours of training, more than was claimed in Dvorak's Navy test), Strong took a second group of QWERTY typists chosen for equal ability to the Dvorak group and retrained them in QWERTY in order to improve their speed at the same time the Dvorak typists were training.

The carefully controlled study failed to show any benefit to the Dvorak keyboard layout in typing or training speed. Strong recommended speed training with QWERTY rather than switching keyboards, and attributed the previous apparent benefits of Dvorak to improper experimental design and outright bias on the part of Dvorak, who had designed and directed the previous studies. However, Strong had a personal grudge against Dvorak and had made public statements before his study opposing new keyboard designs. After this study, interest in the Dvorak keyboard waned. Later experiments have shown that many keyboard designs, including some alphabetical ones, allow very similar typing speeds to QWERTY and Dvorak when typists have been trained for them, suggesting that Dvorak's careful design principles may have had little effect because keyboard layout is only a small part of the complicated physical activity of typing.

The work of Dvorak paved the way for other optimized keyboard layouts for English such as Colemak, but also for other languages such as the German Neo and the French BÉPO.

=== Original layout ===
The typewriter keyboard layout that Dvorak and Dealey patented

The Dvorak typewriter keyboard layout that was publicly promulgated

Over the decades, symbol keys were shifted around the keyboard resulting in variations of the Dvorak design. In 1982, the American National Standards Institute (ANSI) implemented a standard for the Dvorak layout known as ANSI X4.22-1983. This standard gave the Dvorak layout official recognition as an alternative to the QWERTY keyboard.

The layout standardized by the ANSI differs from the original or "classic" layout devised and promulgated by Dvorak. Indeed, the layout promulgated publicly by Dvorak differed slightly from the layout for which Dvorak & Dealey applied for a patent in 1932 – most notably in the placement of Z. Today's keyboards have more keys than the original typewriter did, and other significant differences existed:

- The numeric keys of the classic Dvorak layout are ordered: 7531902468 (an order used today in the "Programmer Dvorak" layout)
- In the classic Dvorak layout, the question mark key ? is in the leftmost position of the upper row, while the slash key / is in the rightmost position of the upper row
- For the classic Dvorak layout, the following symbols share keys (the second symbol being printed when the [shift] key is pressed):
  - colon : and question mark ?
  - ampersand & and slash /

Modern U.S. Dvorak layouts almost always place ; and : together on a single key, and / and ? together on a single key. Thus, if the keycaps of a modern keyboard are rearranged so that the unshifted symbol characters match the classic Dvorak layout, then the result is the ANSI Dvorak layout.

== Availability in operating systems ==
Dvorak is included with all major operating systems (such as Windows, macOS, Linux, and BSD).

=== Early PCs ===
Although some word processors could simulate alternative keyboard layouts by software, this was application specific; if more than one program was commonly used (e.g., a word processor and a spreadsheet), the user could be forced to switch layouts depending on the application. Occasionally, stickers were provided to place over the keys for these layouts.

However, IBM-compatible PCs used an active, "smart" keyboard. Striking a key generated a key "code", which was sent to the computer. Thus, changing to an alternative keyboard layout was accomplished most easily by simply buying a keyboard with the new layout. Because the key codes were generated by the keyboard itself, all software would respond accordingly. In the mid to late 1980s, a small industry for replacement PC keyboards developed; although most of these were concerned with keyboard "feel" and/or programmable macros, there were several with alternative layouts, such as Dvorak.

=== Amiga ===
Amiga operating systems from the 1986 version 1.2 onward allow the user to modify the keyboard layout by using the setmap command line utility with "usa2" as an argument, or later in 3.x systems by opening the keyboard input preference widget and selecting "Dvorak". Amiga systems versions 1.2 and 1.3 came with the Dvorak keymap on the Workbench disk. Versions 2.x came with the keymaps available on the "Extras" disk. In 3.0 and 3.1 systems, the keymaps were on the "Storage" disk. By copying the respective keymap to the Workbench disk or installing the system to a hard drive, Dvorak was usable for Workbench application programs.

=== Microsoft Windows ===
Versions of Microsoft Windows including Windows 95, Windows NT 3.51 and later have shipped with U.S. Dvorak layout capability. Free updates to use the layout on earlier Windows versions are available for download from Microsoft.

Earlier versions, such as DOS 6.2/Windows 3.1, included four keyboard layouts: QWERTY, two-handed Dvorak, right-hand Dvorak, and left-hand Dvorak.

In May 2004, Microsoft published an improved version of its Keyboard Layout Creator (MSKLC version 1.3 – current version is 1.4) that allows anyone to easily create any keyboard layout desired, thus allowing the creation and installation of any international Dvorak keyboard layout such as Dvorak Type II (for German), Svorak (for Swedish) etc.

=== Unix-based systems ===
Many operating systems based on UNIX, including OpenBSD, FreeBSD, NetBSD, OpenSolaris, Plan 9, and most Linux distributions, can be configured to use the U.S. Dvorak layout and a handful of variants. Furthermore, all current Unix-like systems with X.Org and appropriate keymaps installed (and virtually all systems meant for desktop use include them) are able to use any QWERTY-labeled keyboard as a Dvorak one without any problems or additional configuration. This eliminates the burden of producing additional keymaps for every variant of QWERTY provided. Runtime layout switching is also possible.

=== ChromeOS ===
ChromeOS and ChromiumOS offer Dvorak, and there are three different ways to switch the keyboard to the Dvorak layout. ChromeOS includes the US Dvorak and UK Dvorak layouts.

=== Apple computers ===
Apple had Dvorak advocates since the company's early (pre-IPO) days. Several engineers devised hardware and software to remap the keyboard, which were used inside the company and even sold commercially.

==== Apple II ====
The Apple IIe had a keyboard ROM that translated keystrokes into characters. The ROM contained both QWERTY and Dvorak layouts, but the QWERTY layout was enabled by default. A modification could be made and was reversible and did no damage. By flipping a switch, the user could switch from one layout to the other. This modification was entirely unofficial but was inadvertently demonstrated at the 1984 Comdex show, in Las Vegas, by an Apple employee whose mission was to demonstrate Apple Logo II. The employee had become accustomed to the Dvorak layout and brought the necessary parts to the show, installed them in a demo machine, then did his Logo demo. Viewers, curious that he always reached behind the machine before and after allowing other people to type, asked him about the modification. He spent as much time explaining the Dvorak keyboard as explaining Logo.

Apple brought new interest to the Dvorak layout with the Apple IIc, which had a mechanical switch above the keyboard whereby the user could switch back and forth between the QWERTY and Dvorak. The IIc Dvorak layout was even mentioned by 1984 advertisements, which stated that the world's fastest typist, Barbara Blackburn, had set a record on an Apple IIc with the Dvorak layout.

Dvorak was also selectable using the built-in control panel applet on the Apple IIGS.

==== Apple III ====
The Apple III used a keyboard-layout file loaded from a floppy disk: the standard system-software package included QWERTY and Dvorak layout files. Changing layouts required restarting the machine.

==== Apple Lisa ====
The Apple Lisa did not offer the Dvorak keyboard mapping, though it was purportedly available through undocumented interfaces.

==== macOS ====
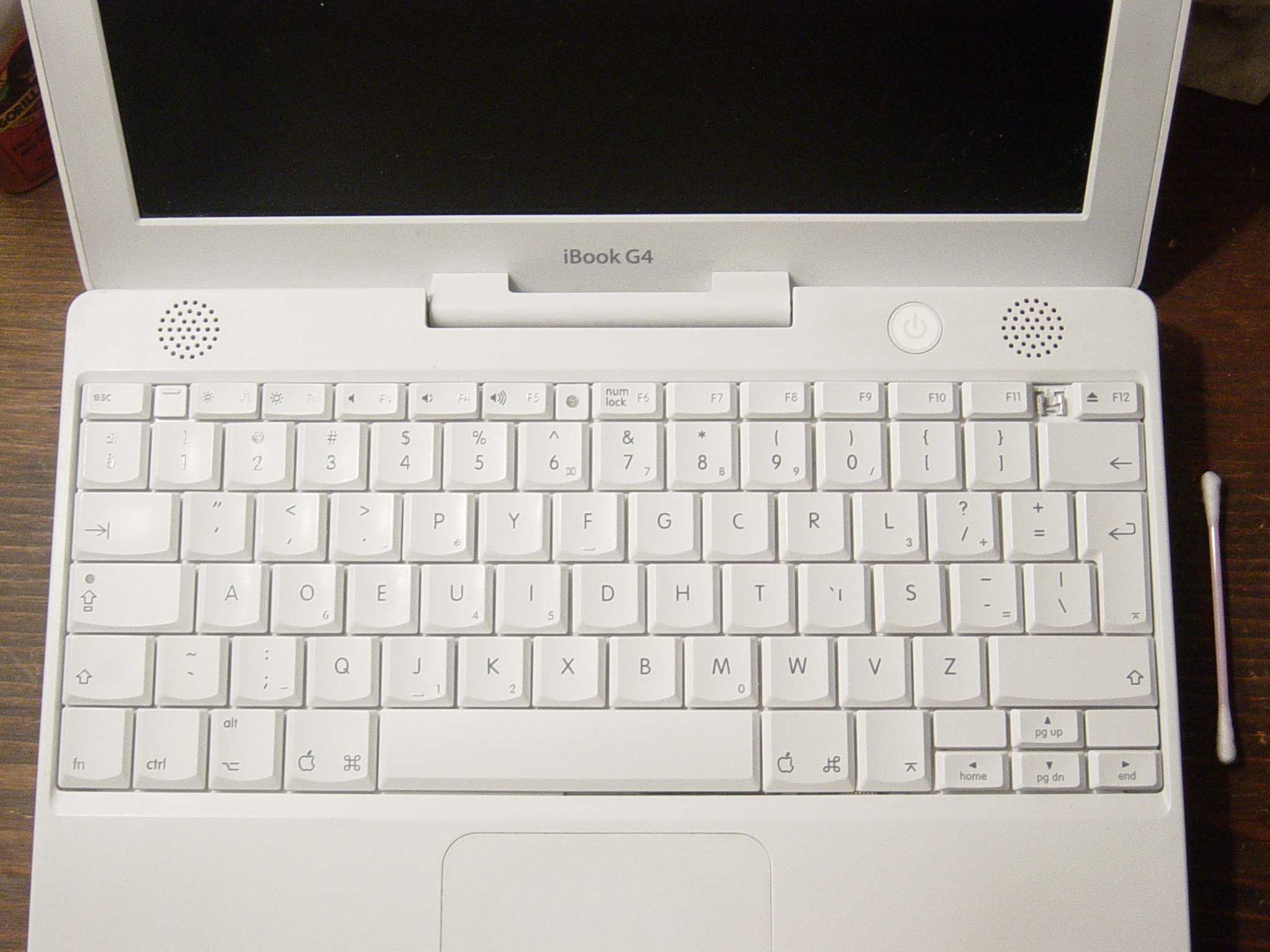
iBook with alpha and punctuation keys manually rearranged to the Dvorak layout

In the early days, Macintosh users could only use the Dvorak layout by editing the "System" file using Apple's "RESource EDITor" ResEdit – which allowed users to create and edit keyboard layouts, icons, and other interface components.

By 1994, a package named 'Electric Dvorak' by John Rethorst provided an easily user-installable "implementation [that] was particularly good on pre-system 7 Macs" as freeware, and especially useful for Mac+ and Mac SE machines running MacOS 6 and 7.

Another third-party developer offered a utility program called MacKeymeleon, which put a menu on the menu bar that allowed on-the-fly switching of keyboard layouts. Eventually, Apple Macintosh engineers built the functionality of this utility into the standard system software, along with a few layouts: QWERTY, Dvorak, French (AZERTY), and other foreign-language layouts.

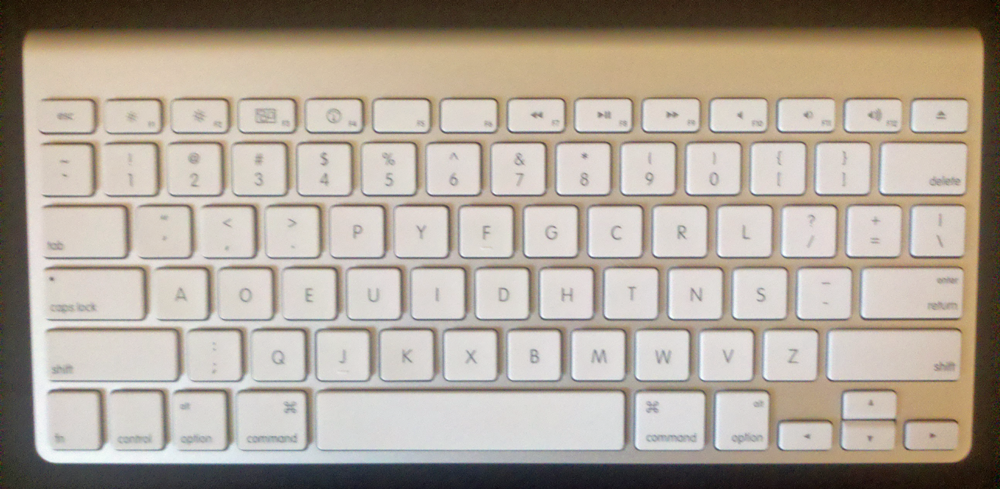
2010 Apple Wireless Keyboard rearranged to the Dvorak layout

Since about 1998, beginning with Mac OS 8.6, Apple has included the Dvorak layout. It can be activated with the Keyboard Control Panel and selecting "Dvorak". The setting is applied once the Control Panel is closed out. Apple also includes a Dvorak variant they call "Dvorak – Qwerty ⌘". With this layout, the keyboard temporarily becomes QWERTY when the Command (⌘/Apple) key is held down. By keeping familiar keyboard shortcuts like "close" or "copy" on the same keys as ordinary QWERTY, this lets some people use their well-practiced muscle memory and may make the transition easier. Mac OS and subsequently Mac OS X allow additional "on-the-fly" switching between layouts: a menu-bar icon (by default, a national flag that matches the current language, a 'DV' represents Dvorak and a 'DQ' represents Dvorak – Qwerty ⌘) brings up a drop-down menu, allowing the user to choose the desired layout. Subsequent keystrokes will reflect the choice, which can be reversed the same way.

Mac OS X 10.5 "Leopard" and later offer a keyboard identifier program that asks users to press a few keys on their keyboards. Dvorak, QWERTY and many national variations of those designs are available. If multiple keyboards are connected to the same Mac computer, they can be configured to different layouts and use simultaneously. However should the computer shut down (lack of battery, etc.) the computer will revert to QWERTY for reboot, regardless of what layout the Admin was using.

=== Mobile phones and PDAs ===
Most mobile phones have software implementations of keyboards on a touch screen. Sometimes the keyboard layout can be changed by means of a freeware third-party utility, such as Hacker's Keyboard for Android, AE Keyboard Mapper for Windows Mobile, or KeybLayout for Symbian OS.

The RIM BlackBerry lines offer only QWERTY and its localized variants AZERTY and QWERTZ.

==== iOS ====
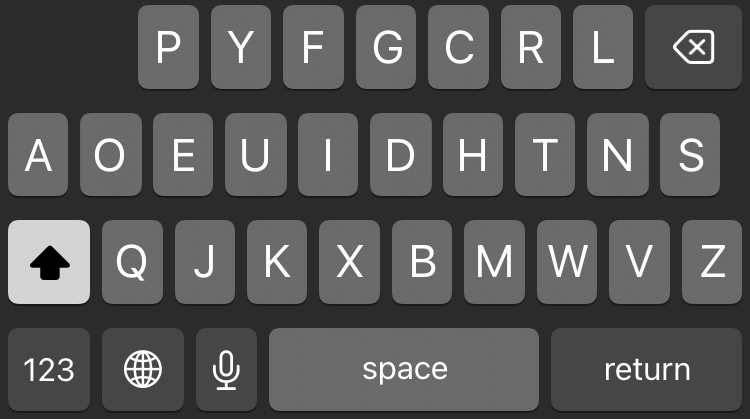
A screenshot of a Dvorak Keyboard layout on iOS 16 from an iPhone

Since the introduction of iOS 8 in 2014, Apple iPhone and iPad users have been able to install third party keyboards on their touchscreen devices which allow for alternative keyboard layouts such as Dvorak on a system wide basis. Starting with iOS 16, the Dvorak keyboard became available as an included system wide keyboard.

Apple iOS 4.0 and later supported external Dvorak keyboards. iOS 8.0 and later had the option to install onscreen keyboards from the App Store, which includes several free and paid Dvorak layouts. Apple added native support for the Dvorak keyboard with the release of iOS 16 in September 2022.

==== Android ====
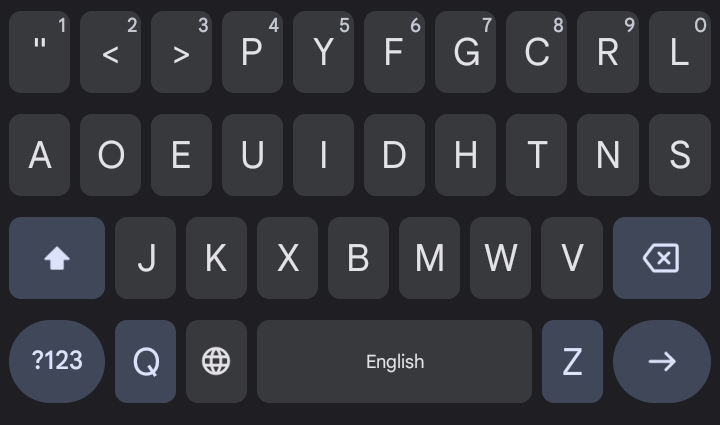
A screenshot of a Dvorak Keyboard on Android

Google's Android OS touchscreen keyboard can use Dvorak and other nonstandard layouts natively as of version 4.1.

== Comparison of the QWERTY and Dvorak layouts ==
=== Keyboard strokes ===
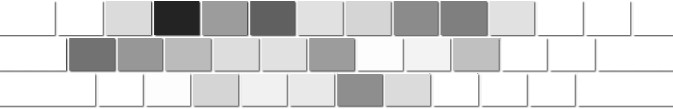
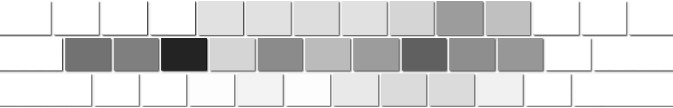
Diagram of English letter frequencies on QWERTY (top) and Dvorak (bottom); darker shade indicates higher rate of occurrence.

The traditional method for touch typing requires typists to rest their fingers in home position (on QWERTY, the "ASDF" and "JKL;" keys). The row containing said keys is called the home row. The more strokes there are in the home row, the less movement the fingers must do, thus allowing a typist to type faster, more accurately, and with less strain to the hand and fingers.

According to letter frequency analysis, the majority of the Dvorak layout's key strokes (70%) are done in the home row, claimed to be the easiest row to type because the fingers rest there. Additionally, the Dvorak layout requires the fewest strokes on the bottom row (the most difficult row to type). By contrast, QWERTY requires typists to move their fingers to the top row for a majority of strokes and has only 32% of the strokes done in the home row.

Because the Dvorak layout concentrates the vast majority of key strokes to the home row, the Dvorak layout uses about 63% of the finger motion required by QWERTY, which is claimed to make the keyboard more ergonomic. Because the Dvorak layout requires less finger motion from the typist compared to QWERTY, some users with repetitive strain injuries have reported that switching from QWERTY to Dvorak alleviated or even eliminated their repetitive strain injuries; however, no scientific study has been conducted verifying this.

The typing loads between hands differs for each of the keyboard layouts. On QWERTY keyboards, 56% of the typing strokes are done by the left hand. As the right hand is dominant for the majority of people, the Dvorak keyboard puts the more often used keys on the right hand side, thereby having 56% of the typing strokes done by the right hand.

=== Awkward strokes ===
Awkward strokes are undesirable because they slow down typing, increase typing errors, and increase finger strain. The term hurdling refers to an awkward stroke requiring a single finger to jump directly from one row, over the home row to another row (e.g., typing "minimum" [which often comes out as "minimun" or "mimimum"] on the QWERTY keyboard). In the English language, there are about 1,200 words that require a hurdle on the QWERTY layout. In contrast, there are only a few words requiring a hurdle on the Dvorak layout (e.g. "spiky", where the "piky" is typed entirely on the left pointer finger; it corresponds to ";rgvt" on QWERTY).

=== Hand alternation and finger repetition ===
It is claimed that words involving both hands can be typed faster than words involving only one hand, and with more hand alternation there is, the faster it can be typed. This improvement comes from splitting the workload more evenly between the two hands.

The QWERTY layout has more than 3,000 words that are typed on the left hand alone and about 300 words that are typed on the right hand alone (the aforementioned word "minimum" is a right-hand-only word). In contrast, with the Dvorak layout, only a few words are typed using only the left hand and even fewer use the right hand alone. This is because most syllables require at least one vowel, and, in a Dvorak layout, all the vowels (including "y") fall on the left side of the keyboard.

However, this benefit dwindles for longer words, because one English syllable can contain numerous consonants (as in "schmaltz" or "strengths").

=== Standard keyboard ===
QWERTY enjoys advantages over Dvorak, due to the fact that it is the de facto standard keyboard:

- Keyboard shortcuts in most major operating systems, including Windows, are designed for QWERTY users, and can be awkward for some Dvorak users, such as Ctrl-C (copy) and Ctrl-V (paste). However, Apple computers have a "Dvorak – Qwerty ⌘" setting, which temporarily changes the keyboard mapping to QWERTY when the command (⌘) key is held, and Windows users can replicate this setting using AutoHotkey scripts.
- Some public computers (such as in libraries) will not allow users to change the keyboard to the Dvorak layout.
- Some standardized exams will not allow test takers to use the Dvorak layout (e.g. Graduate Record Examination).
- Support for Dvorak in games, especially those that make use of "WASD" – an ergonomic inverted-T shape using QWERTY but spread out across the keyboard in Dvorak – for in-game movement vary. Some games will automatically detect the keyboard is in Dvorak and adjust keys to the Dvorak equivalent, ",AOE", while others allow the same effect with some manual tweaking; games with hard-coded keybinds that do not allow changing the keys away from WASD become practically impossible to play under Dvorak.
- People who can touch type with a QWERTY keyboard will be less productive with alternative layouts until they retrain themselves, even if these are closer to the optimum.
- Not all people use keyboard fingerings as specified in touch-typing manuals due to either preference or anatomical difference. This can change the relative efficiency on alternative layouts.

== Variants ==
=== One-handed versions ===
Left-handed Dvorak layout with the ")(" placement of parentheses

Right-handed Dvorak layout

In the 1960s, Dvorak designed left- and right-handed Dvorak layouts for touch-typing with only one hand. He tried to minimize the need to move the hand from side to side (lateral travel), as well as to minimize finger movement. Each layout has the hand resting near the center of the keyboard, rather than on one side: the index finger rests on E and the pinky on D.

Because the layouts require less hand movement than layouts designed for two hands, they can be more accessible to single-handed users. The layouts are also used by people with full use of two hands, who prefer having one hand free while they type with the other.

The left-handed Dvorak and right-handed Dvorak keyboard layouts are mostly each other's mirror image, with the exception of some punctuation keys, some of the less-used letters, and the 'wide keys' (Enter, Shift, etc.). Dvorak arranged the parentheses as ")(" on his left-handed keyboard, but some keyboards place them in the typical "()" reading order. Dvorak's original ")(" placement is the more widely distributed layout, and the version that ships with Windows.

=== Programmer Dvorak ===
The Programmer Dvorak layout

Programmer Dvorak was developed by Roland Kaufmann and was designed based on code in C, Java, Pascal, Lisp, HTML, CSS and XML.

While the letters are in the same places as the regular Dvorak layout, the numbers and most symbols have been moved. The top row contains brackets, curly brackets, and parentheses positioned in a way which makes opening and closing these symbols more intuitive. Some other common programming symbols are also placed in the top row for easy access: (&%=*+!#). The numbers are in the top row as well but the Shift key must be used to type them like on typewriters. The numbers are arranged with the odds under the left hand and the evens under the right hand, as on Dvorak's original layout. Another notable change is the swap of the semicolon/colon key with the quotation/apostrophe key. Many programming languages require each line to end with a semicolon; therefore, it makes sense to put the semicolon in a spot which is easy to reach.

This layout is preinstalled on some Linux distributions but not on Windows or macOS.

== Research on efficiency ==
The Dvorak layout is designed to improve touch-typing, in which the user rests their fingers on the home row. It would have less effect on other methods of typing such as hunt-and-peck. Some studies show favorable results for the Dvorak layout in terms of speed, while others do not show any advantage, with many accusations of bias or lack of scientific rigor among researchers. The first studies were performed by Dvorak and his associates. These showed favorable results and generated accusations of bias.

In 1956, a study with a sample of 10 people in each group conducted by Earle Strong of the U.S. General Services Administration found Dvorak no more efficient than QWERTY and claimed it would be too costly to retrain the employees. The failure of the study to show any benefit to switching, along with its illustration of the considerable cost of switching, discouraged businesses and governments from making the switch. This study was similarly criticized as being biased in favor of the QWERTY control group.

In the 1990s, economists Stan Liebowitz and Stephen E. Margolis wrote articles in the Journal of Law and Economics and Reason magazine where they rejected Dvorak proponents' claims that the dominance of the QWERTY is due to market failure brought on by QWERTY's early adoption, writing, "[T]he evidence in the standard history of Qwerty versus Dvorak is flawed and incomplete. [...] The most dramatic claims are traceable to Dvorak himself; and the best-documented experiments, as well as recent ergonomic studies, suggest little or no advantage for the Dvorak keyboard."

== Resistance to adoption ==
Although the Dvorak design is the only other keyboard design registered with ANSI and is provided with all major operating systems, attempts to convert universally to the Dvorak design have not succeeded. The failure of Dvorak to displace QWERTY has been the subject of some studies.

A discussion of the Dvorak layout is sometimes used as an exercise by management consultants to illustrate the difficulties of change. The Dvorak layout is often used in economics textbooks as a standard example of network effects, though this method has been criticized.

Most keyboards are based on QWERTY layouts, despite the availability of other keyboard layouts, including Dvorak.

== Other languages ==
Although DSK (Dvorak Simplified Keyboard) is implemented in many languages other than English, there are still potential issues. Every Dvorak implementation for other languages has the same difficulties as for Roman characters. However, other (occidental) language orthographies can have other typing needs for optimization (many are very different from English). Because Dvorak was optimized for the statistical distribution of letters of English text, keyboards for other languages would likely have different distributions of letter frequencies. Hence, non-QWERTY-derived keyboards for such languages would need a keyboard layout that might be quite different from the Dvorak layout for English.

=== Brazilian Portuguese ===
There are some nonstandard Brazilian Dvorak keyboard designs. The simpler design (also called BRDK) is just a Dvorak layout plus some keys from the Brazilian ABNT2 keyboard layout. Another design, however, was specifically designed for Brazilian Portuguese, by means of a study that optimized typing statistics, like frequent letters, trigraphs and words.

=== Danish ===
The Danish layout DanskDvorak is similar to the Norwegian.

=== Finnish ===
A FinnishDAS keyboard layout follows many of Dvorak's design principles, but the layout is an original design based on the most common letters and letter combinations of the Finnish language. Matti Airas has also made another layout for Finnish. Finnish can also be typed reasonably well with the English Dvorak layout if the letters ä and ö are added. The Finnish ArkkuDvorak keyboard layout adds both on a single key and keeps the American placement for each other character. As with DAS, the SuoRak keyboard is designed by the same principles as the Dvorak keyboard, but with the most common letters of the Finnish language taken into account. Contrary to DAS, it keeps the vowels on the left side of the keyboard and most consonants on the right hand side.

=== French ===
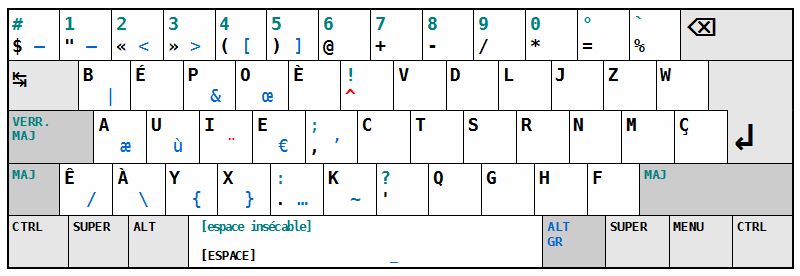
Dvorak, with a French BÉPO layout

In French, there is a Dvorak layout, as well as the Bépo layout, designed based on Dvorak's method of analyzing key frequency. Although Bépo's placement of keys is optimized for French, the scheme also facilitates key combinations for typing characters of other European languages, Esperanto and various symbols.

=== German ===
The most common German Dvorak layout is the German Type II layout. It is available for Windows, Linux, and macOS. There is also the Neo layout and the de ergo layout, both original layouts that also use many of Dvorak's design principles. Because of the similarity of both languages, even the standard Dvorak layout (with minor modifications) is an ergonomic improvement with respect to the common QWERTZ layout. One such modification puts ß at the shift+comma position and the umlaut dots as a dead key accessible via shift+period (standard German keyboards have a separate less/greater key to the right of the left shift key).

=== Icelandic ===
An IcelandicDvorak layout exists, created by a student at Reykjavik University. It retains the same basic layout as the standard Dvorak but features special Alt-Gr functions to allow easy usage for common characters such as "þ", "æ", "ö" and dead-keys to allow the typing of characters such as "å" and "ü".

=== Norwegian ===
The Norwegian implementation (known as "NorskDvorak") is similar to Parment's layout, with "æ" and "ø" replacing "ä" and "ö".

=== Polish ===
Polish propositions of a national keyboard layout similar to Dvorak were created in 1950s but were not introduced due to a new version of Polish Norm in 1958 with modernized QWERTZ layout.

=== Romanian ===
A Romanian version of the Dvorak layout (named Popak after the name of its inventor) was released in October 2008. It is available for both Windows and Linux.

=== Russian ===
There is a Russian keyboard based on Dvorak, called: Diktor layout. It is natively available on linux.

=== Spanish ===
Three Spanish layouts exist.

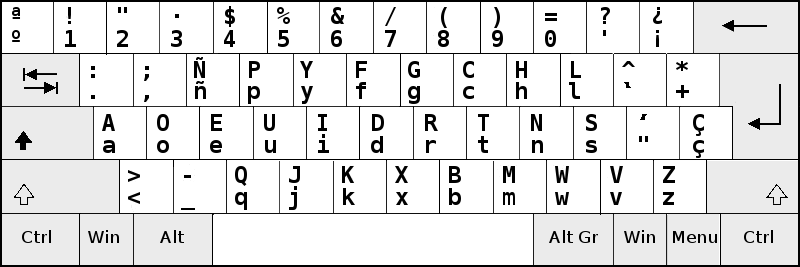
Spanish Dvorak keyboard layouts

Latinoamerican Dvorak keyboard layouts

=== Swedish ===
The Svorak Keyboard layout

The Svorak (Swedish Dvorak) layout places the three extra Swedish vowels (å, ä and ö) on the leftmost three keys of the upper row, which correspond to punctuation symbols on the English Dvorak layout. This retains the original English DVORAK design goal of keeping all vowels by the left hand, including Y which is a vowel in Swedish.

The displaced punctuation symbols (period and comma) end up at the edges of the keyboard, but every other symbol is in the same place as in the standard Swedish QWERTY layout, facilitating easier re-learning. The Alt-Gr key is required to access some of the punctuation symbols. This major design goal also makes it possible to "convert" a Swedish QWERTY keyboard to SVORAK simply by moving keycaps around.

Unlike for Norway, there is no standard Swedish Dvorak layout and the community is fragmented. In Svdvorak, by Gunnar Parment, the punctuation symbols are as they were in the English version; the first extra vowel (å) is placed in the far left of the top row while the other two (ä and ö) are placed at the far left of the bottom row.

=== Turkish ===
The Turkish F keyboard layout (link in Turkish) is also an original design with Dvorak's design principles; however it is not clear whether it is inspired by Dvorak. Turkish F keyboard was standardized in 1955 and the design has been a requirement for imported typewriters since 1963.

=== UK English ===

Whether Dvorak or QWERTY, a United Kingdom keyboard differs from the U.S. equivalent in these ways: the " and @ are swapped; the backslash/pipe [\ |] key is in an extra position (to the right of the lower left shift key); there is a taller return/enter key, which places the hash/tilde [# ~] key to its lower left corner (see picture).

The most notable difference between the U.S. and UK Dvorak layouts is the [2 "] key remains on the top row, whereas the U.S. [' "] key moves. This means that the query [/ ?] key retains its classic Dvorak location, top right, albeit shifted.

Interchanging the [/ ?] and [' @] keys more closely matches the U.S. layout, and the use of "@" has increased in the information technology age. These variations, plus keeping the numerals in Dvorak's idealized order, appear in the Classic Dvorak and Dvorak for the Left Hand and Right Hand varieties.

== See also ==
- Chorded keyboard
- Colemak layout
- EurKEY layout
- Kinesis contoured keyboard
- Maltron keyboard
- Path dependence
- Stenotype
- Velotype
