= August Dvorak =

American educational psychologist (1894–1975)

- Born: May 5, 1894; Glencoe, Minnesota, U.S.
- Died: October 9, 1975 (aged 81); Seattle, Washington, U.S.
- Occupations: Psychologist, Professor, Designer
- Spouse: Hermione D. Dvorak
- Children: 3 daughters
- Relatives: John C. Dvorak (nephew)

August Dvorak (May 5, 1894 – October 9, 1975) was an American educational psychologist and professor of education at the University of Washington in Seattle, Washington. He and his brother-in-law, William Dealey, are best known for creating the Dvorak keyboard layout in the 1930s as a replacement for the QWERTY keyboard layout.

While his name is pronounced [ˈdvor̝aːk], with the ř roughly as a simultaneous trilled [r] and [ʒ] due to him being of Czech descent, Dvorak's family in the U.S. pronounces it /ˈdvɔːræk/, with an English r.

== Early life ==
August Dvorak was born on May 5, 1894.

=== Military service ===
Dvorak served with the American Army Field Artillery during the punitive expedition against Pancho Villa and was wounded during the campaign. Afterward he was discharged and enlisted in the United States Naval Reserve, teaching mathematics and navigation until World War I, during which he served aboard the captured German privateer USS Callao bringing troops home until his discharge in 1919. Later, he was the captain of a Gato-class submarine in the United States Navy during World War II.

=== Education ===
Dvorak graduated from the University of Minnesota with a B.A. in 1920 and a Ph.D. in 1923. He taught at the University of Washington from 1923 to 1964.

== Keyboard development ==
In the 1940s, Dvorak designed keyboard layouts for people with the use of one hand.

Dvorak and Dealey, together with Nellie Merrick and Gertrude Ford, wrote the book Typewriting Behavior, published in 1936. The book is an in-depth report on the psychology and physiology of typing.

== Life and family ==
Dr. August Dvorak died in Seattle on October 9, 1975.
