= Romanian keyboard layout =

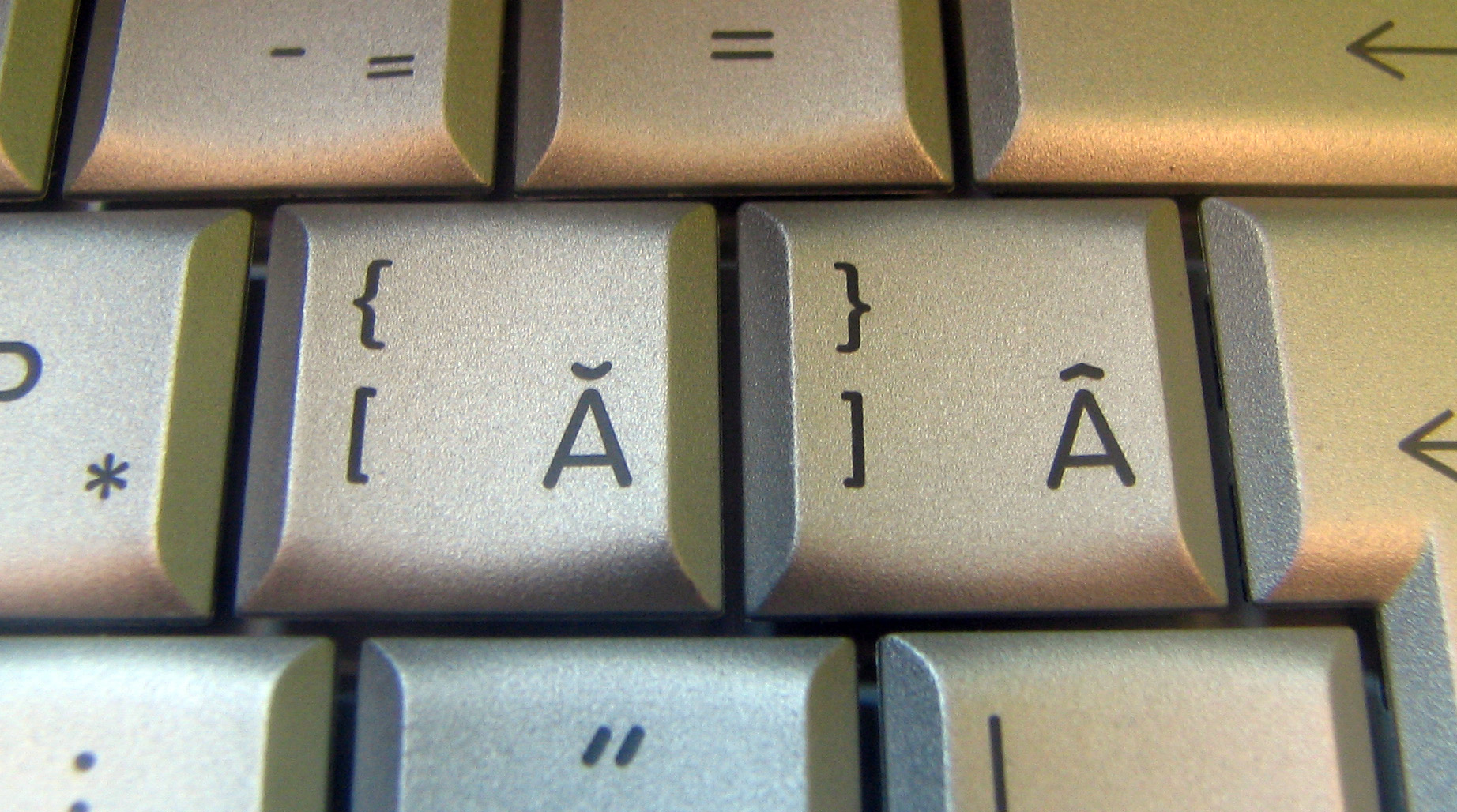
Romanian letters Ă and Â on the keyboard of an Apple MacBook Pro

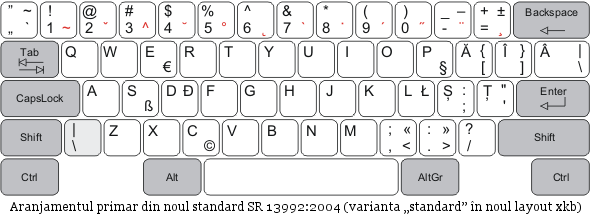
Romanian SR 13392:2004 ("primary") keyboard layout

The original MS Windows' Romanian keyboard (Legacy, QWERTZ). It actually had the cedilla characters and lacked the Euro sign, and in some versions, the dead keys were not implemented, as upon they were typed, they were actually simple diacritic characters.

The current Romanian National Standard SR 13392:2004 establishes two layouts for Romanian keyboards: a "primary" one and a "secondary" one.

The "primary" layout is intended for more traditional users that learned long ago how to type with older, Microsoft-style implementations of the Romanian keyboard. The "secondary" layout is mainly used by programmers and it does not contradict the physical arrangement of keys on a US-style keyboard. The "secondary" arrangement is used as the default one by the majority of Linux distributions.

There are four Romanian-specific characters that are incorrectly implemented in all Microsoft Windows versions before Vista:

- U+0218 Ș LATIN CAPITAL LETTER S WITH COMMA BELOW – incorrectly implemented as U+015E Ş LATIN CAPITAL LETTER S WITH CEDILLA
- U+0219 ș LATIN SMALL LETTER S WITH COMMA BELOW – incorrectly implemented as U+015F ş LATIN SMALL LETTER S WITH CEDILLA
- U+021A Ț LATIN CAPITAL LETTER T WITH COMMA BELOW – incorrectly implemented as U+0162 Ţ LATIN CAPITAL LETTER T WITH CEDILLA
- U+021B ț LATIN SMALL LETTER T WITH COMMA BELOW – incorrectly implemented as U+0163 ţ LATIN SMALL LETTER T WITH CEDILLA

This was due to the fact that in early versions of Unicode, the Romanian letters Ț (T-comma) and Ș (S-comma) were considered to be glyph variants of Ţ (T-cedilla) and Ş (S-cedilla) respectively, and therefore were not present in the Unicode Standard. The letters were only added to the standard in Unicode 3.0 (1999).

Since Romanian hardware keyboards are not widely available, Cristian Secară has created a driver that allows the Romanian characters to be generated with a US-style keyboard, in all Windows versions previous to Vista. It uses the right AltGr key modifier to generate the characters.

== Legacy QWERTZ Windows keyboard ==
Before Windows Vista, this keyboard layout was the default for Romanian. From Vista onwards, its name is "Romanian (Legacy) Keyboard".

This legacy layout uses the wrong cedilla-based diacritics instead of the correct commabelow-based ones: Ș and Ț. Beware that in some fonts t-cedilla and T-cedilla are rendered using the commabellow accent, e.g. in some Adobe fonts.

== Popak Layout ==
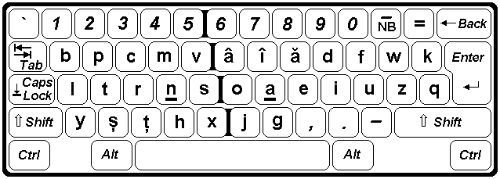
Popak keyboard layout

The Popak keyboard is an ergonomic layout designed with the Romanian language's specific needs in mind, similar to the Dvorak keyboard's approach. Its primary objective is to enhance typing speed and accuracy, surpassing that of the standard QWERTY keyboard, even when used for English.

Distinct from the QWERTY layout, the Popak keyboard features a unique key arrangement that minimizes finger movement by positioning frequently used keys in easily accessible locations. More than half of the typing is performed with fingers remaining on the home row, which contributes to improved typing efficiency.

The keyboard is designed to accommodate Romanian diacritics (ă, â, î, ș, ț) and other special Romanian characters such as low and high quotation marks. The layout requires users to adapt to a different key placement, as the physical key positions do not correspond directly to their labeled functions.

The Popak keyboard is compatible with various operating systems, including Windows, macOS, and Linux.
