= Neo (keyboard layout) =

Keyboard layout optimized for German

Layers of the Neo Layout

Layer 1

Layer 2

Layer 3

Layer 4

Layer 5

Layer 6

The Neo layout is an optimized German keyboard layout developed in 2004 by the Neo Users Group, supporting nearly all Latin-based alphabets, including the International Phonetic Alphabet, the Vietnamese language, and some Cyrillic alphabets.

The positions of the letters are optimized not only for German letter frequency, but also for typical groups of two or three letters. English is considered a major target as well. The design tries to enforce the alternating usage of both hands to increase typing speed. It is based on ideas from de-ergo and other ergonomic layouts. The high frequency keys are placed in the home row. The current layout Neo 2.0 has unique features not present in other layouts, making it suited for many target groups such as programmers, mathematicians, scientists and LaTeX authors. Neo is grouped in different layers, each designed for a special purpose.

Most special characters inherit the meaning of the lower layers—the ⟨¿⟩ character is one layer above the ⟨?⟩, or the Greek ⟨α⟩ is above the ⟨a⟩ character. Neo uses a total of six layers with the following general use:

1. Lowercase letters
2. Uppercase letters, typographical characters
3. Special characters for programming, etc.
4. WASD-like movement keys and number block
5. Greek lowercase letters
6. Mathematical symbols and Greek uppercase letters

== Concept ==
=== Facilitating ten-finger typing ===
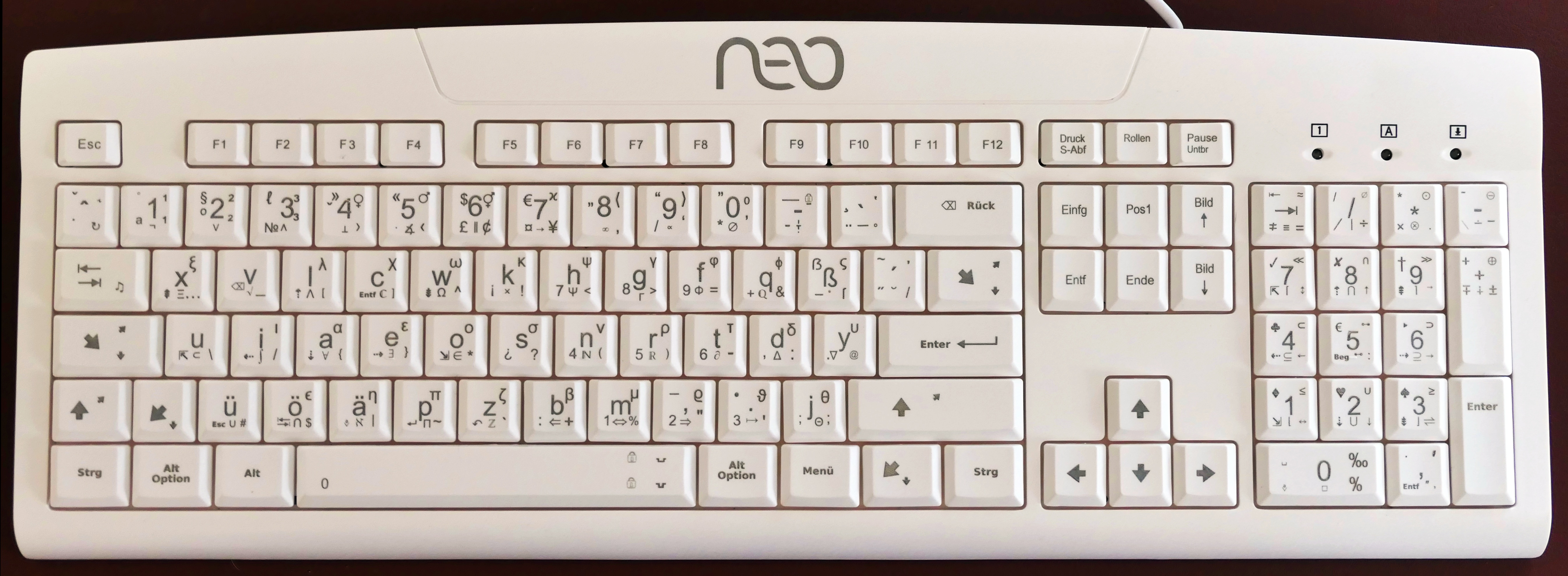
Neo keyboard, produced 2017

On the basis of the statistical distribution of letters of the German language and research on ergonomics, the Neo keyboard layout aims to shorten the finger movements during typing. The most common letters are therefore in the home row and in the positions of the fast index and middle fingers. This allows more words to be entered without the fingers leaving the home row compared to other keyboard layouts.

For an average German-language text 63% of all letters can be typed with fingers in the home row—in contrast to 25% in the usual QWERTZ layout.

In addition, using Neo the hands shall alternate as often as possible during typing and their use be evenly distributed—the QWERTY keyboard layout is very left-heavy.

The drafting of the letter positions took into account the experience from other keyboard layout reforms. Instead of pursuing a purely mathematical or experimental path, Neo combines the insights of both paths with the goal of improving both the ergonomics and the ease of memorization of the keyboard layout.

=== Layers ===
Neo 2 has a total of six levels. The first two levels correspond to the German lowercase and uppercase letters and can be reached by switching as usual layouts. The third level can be reached via the Mod3, which under QWERTZ corresponds to the Caps Lock key and the # key, and contains common punctuation and special characters. Binary and trigrams, which are commonly used in programming, in wikis, when chatting, or in the command line of common operating systems, have been taken into account in the design of this level.

The fourth level can be reached via Mod4, which under QWERTZ corresponds to the Alt Gr key and the < key, contains a numeric keypad and important navigation keys, so you do not have to take your hands off the main field to navigate in a text document. By making the navigation buttons accessible on the main panel, Neo also encounters the criticism expressed in reform keyboards that text editors like Vim would be more difficult to use. This level can be locked just like the second one.

The levels five (Shift + Mod3) and six (Mod3 + Mod4) finally contain small and capital letters in Greek as well as other mathematical and scientific signs.

=== Character variety and typography ===
Neo allows the entry of virtually all languages with Latin-based alphabet, in particular because of the dead keys and additional Compose combinations, of which Neo brings many of its own. The dead keys are located at the top left and right and allow combining the following characters with the corresponding diacritic when hitting the key.

Thus, not only grave, acute and circumflex, but also many other diacritics such as the ring, breve and macron are possible, including the novel dead button "turning" ↻ , for example, from the sign a one can create an ɐ. Together with the fifth level, Neo can be used to create Greek as well as International Phonetic Alphabet symbols. Nevertheless Neo is clearly designed for the German language; for others a change in programming is necessary.

Common Unicode punctuation marks were placed on the keyboard which would otherwise require a character table, or which would otherwise be more difficult to achieve. These characters include German and English curled quotes („ “ ”), the en dash (–), the curled apostrophe (’), and guillemets (« »). The capital ẞ, standardized in June 2008, is also available.

=== Mathematics and special characters ===
On the levels five and six one reaches the Greek letters and numerous characters required for writing formulas, for example symbols for sets ( $\mathbb{N}$ , $\mathbb{R}$ , ∩ , ∪ , ⊂ ), logic ( ¬ , ∨ , ∧ , ⇔ ), derivatives ( ∂ , ∇ ), and many more. By means of the Compose key, for example, the sequence Compose + = + ⊂ can be used to generate the subset-or-equal symbol ⊆.

In addition, the following characters are available with the keyboard layout: biological characters ( ♀ , ♂ , ⚥ ), arrows (↦, ←), physical constants ( ℏ ) and graphic symbols (✔, ✘, ☺).

== Genesis ==
The initial version 1 was introduced in 2004 by Hanno Behrens on the de-ergo keyboards mailing list. The name Neo is a recursive acronym and originally stood for NEO Ergonomic Oops; later the interpretation was set to Neo ergonomically optimized.

Considered were experiences of the Dvorak keyboard layout (around 1932), the ergonomic layout of Helmut Meier (1954) and some later investigations as well as attempts to have an ideal occupancy calculated by algorithms alone. Instead of treading only a purely mathematical or purely experimental way, as is the case with previous ergonomic layouts, Neo takes both findings into account and combines these with consideration of the ergonomics and the quickly memorable arrangement of the keys. Thus, Neo relies on the one hand on statistical surveys, in particular the distribution of letters in German and other languages, and on the other hand on studies on ergonomics by Walter Rohmert, the MARSAN Institute (1979) or Malt (1977).

In 2005, Neo 1.1 started thinking about how to arrange the keys that are often needed when programming. In it are brackets and special characters on the main field with the help of the key Mod3 , which corresponds to the Qwerty caps lock key and the # button and the button Mod4 , which under QWERTY the key Alt Gr and the key < corresponds to reach.

=== Neo 2 ===
Release 2, released on March 29, 2010, introduced these changes:

- In the main level, the keys X, J and Q were swapped cyclically. The X was placed on the left hand so that the frequently used key combinations Ctrl+X, Ctrl+C and Ctrl+V for the commands "Cut", "Copy" and "Paste" are on one hand. ^{[7]}
- The special character level 3 was completely reworked, as the corresponding shift keys are more accessible.
- The higher levels 4-6 were introduced.

== Platforms ==
Since late 2006, Neo has been included in Linux as a variant of the German keyboard layout for the X Window System X.org in all current distributions.

Drivers are downloadable on the project page for common platforms, including Linux, Windows, Mac OS, BSD and Solaris. In addition, free learning software is available for Linux, Windows and Mac OS. The neo-learning software is an official part of the KTouch project.

Under ChromeOS, Neo can be found in the German language settings.

Google's Gboard Keyboard for Android supports Neo2.
