= ETAOI keyboard =

Text input software

ETAOI keyboard is a text input software for touch screen-reliant devices. It is based on ETAOI method for coding.

The keyboard uses five keys. Characters and signs are typed using single and multiple taps, or slides. There are unique combinations of taps and slides for each character.

With no upper limit on the number of keys on which each combination is based, the keyboard can be used for typing an unlimited variety of characters. Combinations encompassing up to three keys are used for typing in Latin-derived alphabets.

== Name and mechanics ==
ETAOI name is derived from the 5 most frequently used letters in English: e, t, a, o, i. These characters are typed using just single taps.

The same efficiency-driven approach has been followed when assigning combinations of taps and slides to all other letters, numbers and signs: the most frequently used ones are also the quickest to produce. This departs from the QWERTY layout, where the position of specific letters is unrelated to the frequency of use.

== Application ==
Because to its conceptual basis, ETAOI is particularly suited for use with screens of limited size. Once mastered, its five keys allow for touch typing (typing without looking) commonly associated with physical keyboards. Top recorded speeds are currently 55 words per minute.

Since all the keys are presented as just one horizontal line placed at the screen’s bottom edge, the ETAOI keyboard usually takes only a third of the screen space required by QWERTY keyboard variants.

Other features include immediate access to characters other than letters without the need to recall additional screens, by applying the relevant combinations of taps and slides. The software can be used to produce letters specific to only some Latin-derived alphabets. Languages currently supported are Spanish, German, French, Italian and Polish.

The keyboard also includes a suite of editing tools with in-built commands allowing to precisely select, copy and paste text.

=== 5-Tiles ===
5-Tiles
- The 5-Tiles logo
- Developer: ETAOI Systems
- Operating system: Android
- Type: Virtual keyboard
- License: Proprietary
- Website: fivetiles.com

5-Tiles is a virtual keyboard for mobile devices with touchscreen that run the Android operating system. It is characterized by needing a small amount of space leaving as much space as possible to the software that needs the keyboard. There are exactly five keys on the keyboard on one line of keys. Characters are typed by tap and swipe gestures.

The five keys of this keyboard all have different colors to be easily distinguishable. You have the following options to type a character:

- Tap on one of the five buttons
- Swipe up or down, beginning on one of the buttons
- Swipe a path on the x-axis beginning on one of the buttons changing direction at different buttons and a different number of times—according to the character—until you finally end up on one of the buttons
- Making a cheat sheet visible with a simple swipe gesture and then tapping one of the symbols listed

The concept of this keyboard was invented in 2004. The co-founder of the company creating this keyboard, Michal Kubacki, first didn't have skills in programming. He learned some skills that allowed him to write basic software for testing purposes and to further develop the keyboard. He got in touch with people who helped him creating the product as a virtual keyboard for Android devices. An early version was downloaded thousands of times. At the 2013 Droidcon Demo Camp the company won the second place. It also received awards in other competitions.

== Learning ==
Given its novelty, ETAOI keyboard is accompanied by a wide range of training materials. These aim to reduce the initial learning times to about 40–60 minutes.

ETAOI alphabet is the recommended starting training program. It helps the user memorize all the combinations, from the most frequently encountered to the least common ones.

ETAOI speed helps the user learn how to type quicker, with the training material consisting of the most popular words, as well as pangrams (sentences using all letters of the alphabet).

== Availability ==
The keyboard is currently available on the Google Play store and includes versions for smart phones and tablet computers.
