= Gboard =

Virtual keyboard app for Android and iOS

- Screenshot A screenshot of Gboard being used on Google Keep
- Developer: Google
- Release: May 12, 2016; 10 years ago

Stable release(s) [±]
- Android: 17.8.4 (Build 939743344) / July 30, 2026; 2 months ago
- Android TV: 16.1.2 (Build 808050806) / December 3, 2025; 10 months ago
- Wear OS: 5.2.3 (Build 872026769) / July 30, 2026; 2 months ago
- iOS (discontinued) (Note: Including iPadOS): 2.3.19 / May 2, 2022; 4 years ago

Preview release(s) [±]
- Android: 17.8.4 (Build 939743344) / July 30, 2026; 2 months ago
- Android TV: 16.1.2 (Build 808050806) / December 3, 2025; 10 months ago
- Operating system: Android 8+ (Note: Including Android TV and Wear OS) Discontinued: Android 6, 7 (2024); iOS 12 (2023); iOS 11 (2022); Android 5, iOS 10 (2020); iOS 9 (2019); Android Jelly Bean, KitKat (2018); Android Ice Cream Sandwich (2016); Android Honeycomb (2013)
- Available in: 916 (Android) & 125 (iOS) languages
- License: Proprietary

Gboard is a virtual keyboard app developed by Google for Android and iOS devices. It was first released for iOS in May 2016, followed by a release for Android in December 2016, debuting as a major update to the already-established Google Keyboard app on Android.

Gboard features Google Search, including web results (removed since April 2020) and predictive answers, easy searching and sharing of GIF and emoji content, a predictive typing engine suggesting the next word depending on context, and multilingual language support. Updates to the keyboard have enabled additional functionality, including GIF suggestions, options for a dark color theme or adding a personal image as the keyboard background, support for voice dictation, next-phrase prediction, and hand-drawn emoji recognition. At the time of its launch on iOS, the keyboard only offered support for the English language, with more languages being gradually added in the following months, whereas on Android, the keyboard supported more than 100 languages at the time of release.

In August 2018, Gboard passed 1 billion installs on the Google Play Store, making it one of the most popular Android apps. This is measured by the Google Play Store and includes downloads by users as well as pre-installed instances of the app. As of April 2025, the app has been downloaded more than 10B times from the Google Play Store.

== Features ==
Gboard is a virtual keyboard app. It features Google Search, including web results (removed for Android version of the app) and predictive answers, easy searching and sharing of GIF and emoji content, and a predictive typing engine suggesting the next word depending on context. At its May 2016 launch on iOS, Gboard only supported the English language, while it supported "more than 100 languages" at its December 2016 launch on the Android platform. Google stated that Gboard would add more languages "over the coming months". As of October 2019, 916 languages are supported on Android.

Gboard features Floating Keyboard and Google Translate in Gboard itself. Gboard supports one-handed mode on Android after its May 2016 update. This functionality was added to the app when it was branded as Google Keyboard. Gboard supports a variety of different keyboard layouts including QWERTY, QWERTZ, AZERTY, Dvorak and Colemak.

An update for the iOS app released in August 2016 added French, German, Italian, Portuguese, and Spanish languages, as well as offering "smart GIF suggestions", where the keyboard will suggest GIFs relevant to the text being written. The keyboard also offers new options for a dark theme or adding a personal image from the camera roll as the keyboard's background. Another new update in March 2018 added Croatian, Czech, Danish, Dutch, Finnish, Greek, Polish, Romanian, Balochi, Swedish, Catalan, Hungarian, Malay, Russian, Latin American Spanish, and Turkish languages, along with support for voice dictation, enabling users to "long press the mic button on the space bar and talk". In April 2017, Google significantly increased the amount of Indian languages supported on Gboard, adding 11 new languages, bringing the total number of supported Indian languages to 22.

In June 2017, the Android app was updated to support recognition of hand-drawn emoji and the ability to predict whole phrases rather than single words. The functionality is expected to come to the iOS app at a later time. Offline voice recognition was added in March 2019.

On February 12, 2020, a new feature "Emoji Kitchen" was introduced that allowed users to mash up different emoji and use them as stickers when messaging. Grammar correction was introduced in October 2021, first on the Pixel 6 series.

In September 2025, an AI writing tool was added to Gboard, which can edit the tone, grammar and conciseness of text, as well as add emoji.

== Reception ==
In 2016, The Wall Street Journal praised the keyboard, particularly the integrated Google search feature. However, it also notes the limitation of lack of direct app integrations for complex tasks or lack of one-handed mode. The Wall Street Journal also praised the predictive typing engine, stating that it "blows past most competitors" and "it gets smarter with use". They also discovered that Gboard "cleverly suggests emojis as you type words". It was noted that there was the lack of a one-handed mode (a feature added in May 2016 for Android), as well as a lack of options for changing color or the size of keys, writing that "If you're looking to customize a keyboard, Gboard isn't for you."

In the later years, the reception shifted toward Gborad's utilities and smart features. Tech news articles highlighted the "emoji kitchen" feature, offline voice dictation, context aware text prediction.

== Criticism ==
Gboard has received criticism regarding privacy, data collection, and user interface changes. While Google states that Gboard does not transmit the actual content of users' keystrokes, independent analyses have shown that the app collects and sends metadata, such as: device information, app usage statistics, and unique device identifiers to Google servers. Google also states that voice input is processed directly on the device, however using the "Fix" feature (to correct dictated text), sends the voice input to Google servers for processing. Additionally, using the integrated search feature requires transmitting user input to Google.

Design updates have also attracted negative feedback, particularly changes to the keyboard's layout and key shapes. For instance, a redesign introducing more rounded keys was widely criticized by users for reducing typing accuracy and limiting customization options.

== See also ==
- Microsoft SwiftKey
- HeliBoard
