= Colemak =

Alternative keyboard layout for Latin script

Colemak keyboard layout (US) using the "ANSI" key arrangement

Colemak is a keyboard layout for Latin-script alphabets, designed to make typing English more efficient and comfortable than QWERTY by placing the most frequently used letters of the English language on the home row, while keeping many common keyboard shortcuts the same as in QWERTY. Released on 1 January 2006, it is named after its inventor, Shai Coleman.

All major modern operating systems, including Microsoft Windows (as of Windows 11, version 24H2), macOS, Linux, Android, ChromeOS, and BSD-based operating systems, support Colemak natively. A program to install the layout on older versions of Windows is available. On Android and iOS, the layout is offered by several virtual keyboard apps like Gboard and SwiftKey, as well as by many apps that support physical keyboards directly.

== Overview ==
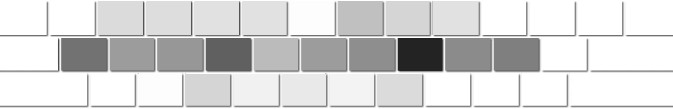
Diagram of English letter frequencies on Colemak

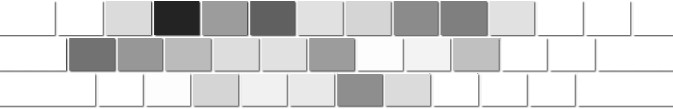
Diagram of English letter frequencies on QWERTY

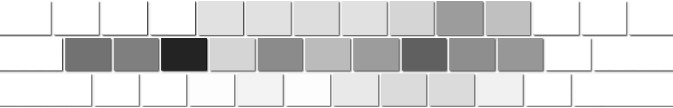
Diagram of English letter frequencies on Dvorak

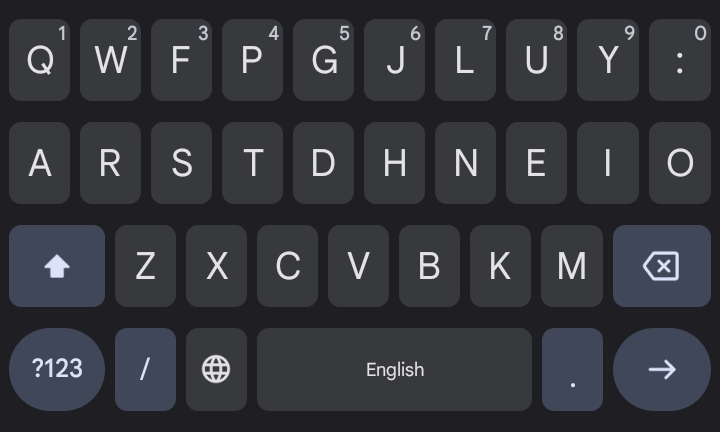
A screenshot of Colemak Keyboard on Android

The Colemak layout was designed with the QWERTY layout as a base, changing the positions of 17 keys while retaining the QWERTY positions of most non-alphabetic characters and many popular keyboard shortcuts, supposedly making it easier to learn than the Dvorak layout for people who already type in QWERTY without losing efficiency. It shares several design goals with the Dvorak layout, such as minimizing finger path distance and making heavy use of the home row. 74% of typing is done on the home row compared to 70% for Dvorak and 32% for QWERTY. The default Colemak layout lacks a Caps Lock key; an additional Backspace key occupies the typical position of Caps Lock on modern keyboards.

Coleman states that he designed Colemak to be fun and easy to learn, explaining that Dvorak is hard for QWERTY typists to learn due to it being so different from the QWERTY layout. The layout has attracted media attention as an alternative to Dvorak for improving typing speed and comfort with an alternate keyboard layout.

== Variants ==
Colemak-DH keyboard layout (UK) using the “ISO” key arrangement

A series of intermediate layouts known as Tarmak have been created with the intention of making it easier for new users to adopt the layout. The layouts change only 3–5 keys at a time in a series of 5 steps.

Colemak has been criticised for placing too much emphasis on the middle-row center-column keys (D and H), leading to awkward lateral finger stretches for common English bigrams such as HE. To address these concerns, the Colemak user community developed a modified version of Colemak named Colemak-DH.

The Colemak community has created several other modifications and variants; some of these are not directly related to Colemak but would work on other layouts as well. The adaptable configuration Miryoku was designed for split ergonomic keyboards and based on Colemak-DH, and adds function, symbol, and navigation layers via home-row mods and 6 thumb keys.

== See also ==
- Chorded keyboard
- Dvorak keyboard layout
- EurKEY Colemak-DH
- Kinesis contoured keyboard
- Path dependence
- Velotype
