= Seslisözlük =

Sesli Sozluk is a multilingual online dictionary, primarily English to Turkish and Turkish to English. German, Italian, French, Spanish, Greek, Russian, Danish, Dutch, Polish and Portuguese translations are also provided. The online dictionary also can be used in PDAs, SmartPhones, any phone supporting a web browser.

Seslisozluk.com, established in 1999 as one of the first English-Turkish online dictionaries, is a user-supported online dictionary. The name comes from Turkish sesli sözlük, "dictionary with sound", because the site enables users to listen to the pronunciation of the words.

A contribution system lets users add new translations. With the user contribution feature, the dictionary has been steadily growing since it was started, and has now reached more than 2 million entries. Its users appreciate the easy user interface, fast response and multilanguage capability. The website also has a user forum.

Seslisozluk.com has released its new version, version 5 in December 2008. With this version of the dictionary, word rating feature lets users vote for the best word for given search. For example, a 5 star word is listed in the first place.

With new search bar features, users can see search related images, can listen pronunciations automatically, can see results in compact view and can use a multi language virtual keyboard.

In 2007, Seslisozluk.com has been awarded with the top service award in information category by Informatics Associations of Turkey in Best Web Awards contest.

In 2008, Seslisozluk.com reached the finals at Altın Örümcek Best Web Awards Contest. In January 2010, Seslisozluk announced its free iPhone application.
