= Dream Keyboard =

Mobile app for Android

Dream Keyboard Sinhala
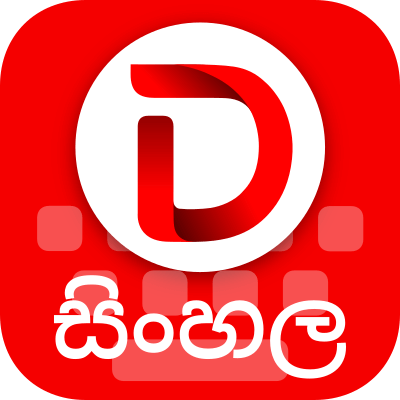
- Developer(s): Malith Dasanayaka
- Initial release: November 2020; 4 years ago
- Operating system: Android
- Size: 8.00 MB (Android)
- Type: Virtual keyboard
- License: Proprietary software
- Website: dreamkeyboard.com

Dream Keyboard is a Sinhala virtual keyboard app for Android devices. It's originally developed by a Sri Lankan app developer called Malith Dasanayaka and was first released for Android in November 2020. It was later developed into the Huawei App Gallery. It's an application that can type Sinhala language using the Standard Wijesekara method and the Singlish method which is popular among Sri Lankans.

Sinhala is one of the least used languages in the world and many keyboard applications in the world do not support it.
