= Microsoft SwiftKey =

Virtual keyboard app

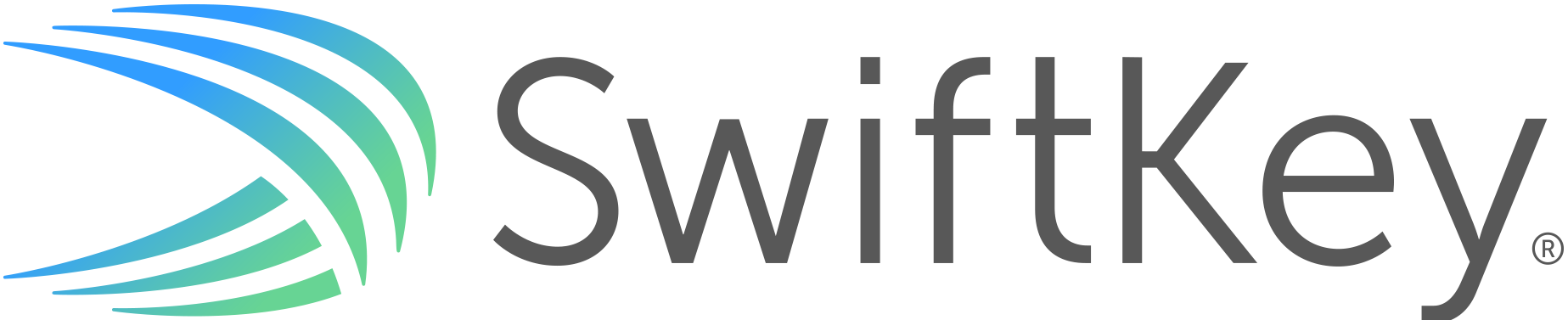

- Screenshot SwiftKey's settings screen, as seen on Android
- Original authors: Jon Reynolds; Ben Medlock
- Developer: Microsoft
- Release: July 2010; 16 years ago

Stable release(s)
- Android: 9.12.14.17 / 15 September 2025
- iOS: 4.2.5 / 10 July 2025
- Operating system: iOS, Android, Windows 10 (versions 1809 to 1909)
- Size: 116 MB (Android); 139.7 MB (iOS)
- Available in: 700+ (Android); 614 (iOS) languages
- Type: Virtual keyboard
- License: Proprietary software
- Website: www.microsoft.com/swiftkey

Microsoft SwiftKey is a virtual keyboard app originally developed by TouchType for Android and iOS devices. It was first released for Android in July 2010, followed by an iOS release in September 2014 after Apple implemented third-party keyboard support.

== History ==
The company behind SwiftKey was founded in 2008 by Jon Reynolds, Ben Medlock and Chris Hill-Scott. Today, their head office is located at the Microsoft offices in Paddington, London, and their other offices are located in San Francisco, California and Seoul.

In September 2013, SwiftKey announced a series B finance round totaling $17.5 million led by Index Ventures, along with Octopus Investments and Accel Partners.

In May 2014, SwiftKey hired James Bromley as COO.

In February 2016, SwiftKey was purchased by Microsoft for USD250 million (~USD328 million in 2025).

In May 2020, the app was rebranded as Microsoft SwiftKey to reflect its present ownership.

In September 2022, Microsoft announced that they were ending support for the iOS version of SwiftKey. The app was ultimately removed from the App Store on 5 October 2022. However, in November 2022, Microsoft announced that they had decided to reverse their decision to discontinue SwiftKey for iOS devices. The app was relisted on 18 November, with Microsoft assuring future updates for the app. The company cited "customer feedback" as a reason for SwiftKey's return.

== Overview ==
Microsoft SwiftKey is a virtual keyboard released on the Android and iOS operating systems. The purpose of the app is to increase efficiency while typing on a mobile phone. According to the Microsoft SwiftKey website, SwiftKey allows the user to speed up their typing process by "giving them more accurate autocorrect and predictions by learning their writing style".

== Release history ==
=== Beta ===
SwiftKey was first released as a beta in the Android Market on 14 July 2010, supporting seven languages. It included a variety of settings to adjust audio feedback volume and length of haptic feedback vibration. It was announced on SwiftKey's official website on 15 May 2014 that a Japanese version was available for beta testing.

=== SwiftKey X ===
On 14 July 2011, SwiftKey X was released to the Android Market as an upgrade to SwiftKey. The upgrade brought updated features and SwiftKey X introduced a dedicated app for tablets called SwiftKey Tablet X. New features included:

- A new artificial intelligence engine to predict phrases and learn the user's writing style.
- A cloud-based personalization service which analyses how the user types in Gmail, Twitter, Facebook, and text messages, to predict phrases in the user's style.
- Technology that continually monitors the user's typing precision and adapts the touch-sensitive area of the touch screen for each key.
- Simultaneous use of multiple languages, allowing users to type in up to three languages at once with language-specific auto-correction.
- Split key layout on SwiftKey Tablet X to improve thumb typing while using a larger touchscreen.
- Additional language support.

=== SwiftKey 3 ===
The SwiftKey 3 update was released on 21 June 2012, including:

- Smart Space which detects spurious or missing spaces in real time.
- Additional language support.

=== SwiftKey 4 ===
The SwiftKey 4 update was released on 20 February 2013, including:

- SwiftKey Flow, a gesture input method with real-time predictions.
- Flow Through Space, a gesture to input whole sentences by gliding to the space bar.
- An updated prediction engine.
- Additional language support, raising the total of supported languages to 60.
- SwiftKey 4.2 introduced SwiftKey Cloud, allowing users to backup and sync their language behavior and software settings, plus Trending Phrases – a feature adding the trending phrases taken from Twitter and localized news sites.

=== SwiftKey 5 ===
The SwiftKey 5 update was released in June 2014, including:

- Freemium transition, taking the app from a paid download to a free download.
- SwiftKey Store, a theme store of free and paid-for color schemes.
- Emoji, adding 800 emoji, plus an Emoji Prediction feature which learns to predict relevant emoji icons.
- Number Row (a row of number keys) option added, in response to customer requests.
- New languages, including Belarusian, Mongolian, Tatar, Uzbek and Welsh.

=== SwiftKey 6 ===
The SwiftKey 6 update was released in November 2015, including:

- Double-Word Prediction adds a new dimension to the predictions you see, predicting your next two words at once.
- A redesign of the emoji panel.
- A complete overhaul of the settings menu in the style of Material Design to make it easier to fine-tune and customize the keyboard
- 5 new languages were added: Yoruba, Igbo, Zulu, Xhosa & Breton

=== SwiftKey 7.0 ===
The SwiftKey 7.0 update was released in March 2018, including:

- A new toolbar
- The ability for one to use their own stickers directly within the software.
- Support for 28 additional languages.

=== SwiftKey for iOS ===
SwiftKey released an iOS application on 30 January 2014, called Swiftkey Note, which incorporates SwiftKey's predictive typing technology as a custom toolbar attached to the top of the regular iOS keyboard.

Starting with iOS 8, released in the second half of 2014, the operating system enables and supports the use of third-party keyboards. SwiftKey confirmed that it was working on a keyboard replacement app.

Starting with iOS 13, the system keyboard came with a built-in QuickPath mechanism, which works similarly to SwiftKey's swiping feature.

SwiftKey for iOS was announced to be deprecated in September 2022. In November 2022, however, Microsoft reverted this decision.

=== SwiftKey for iPhone ===
SwiftKey Keyboard for iPhone, iPad and iPod Touch launched in September 2014 to coincide with the launch of Apple's iOS 8 update. It was unveiled at TechCrunch Disrupt in San Francisco.

The app includes the word prediction and auto-correction features, familiar to the Android product, SwiftKey Cloud backup and sync and personalization, and a choice of color themes.

It reached No. 1 in the free US App Store charts and the company confirmed it had been downloaded more than 1 million times on the first day of launch.

=== Further development ===
On 27 February 2012, the SwiftKey SDK was launched. This allows developers on multiple platforms and programming languages to access SwiftKey's core language-engine technology for their own UI or virtual keyboard.

In June 2012, SwiftKey released a specialized version of its keyboard called SwiftKey Healthcare. It is a virtual keyboard for iOS, Android, Windows Phone and BlackBerry devices that offers next-word predictions based on real-world clinical data. In October 2012, SwiftKey Healthcare won the Appsters Award for Best Enterprise App 2012.

In April 2016, SwiftKey released a keyboard that emulated William Shakespeare's speech called ShakeSpeak in observance of the 400th year of the author's death. The app was co-developed with VisitLondon.com to promote more tourism to the metropolitan area of London.

SwiftKey integration was included with Windows 10 beginning with the October 2018 Update. However, these features were later removed from Windows 10 beginning with the May 2020 Update.

== Controversy ==
In 2015, NowSecure reported a vulnerability present in the version of SwiftKey pre-installed on Samsung devices. This would occur when the keyboard attempted to update its language pack. Samsung has since released security and firmware updates to mitigate the issue. However, TechCrunch published an article on why the issue happened because of how Samsung implemented the keyboard system on its devices.

In 2016, SwiftKey users began reporting that the app was displaying personal details as suggested words to other users who did not have previous connections. Other issues included foreign languages and obscene words. SwiftKey responded by disabling cloud sync for word suggestions and releasing an update to mitigate the issue.

== Awards ==
SwiftKey has received multiple awards, including:

- Sunday Times Hiscox Tech Track 100 2014 ranked third place
- Meffy Award for life tools 2014
- Meffy Award for mobile innovation 2013
- Appsters Champion and Best Consumer App 2013
- Lovie Award People's Lovie for mobile innovation 2013
- Most Effective Mobile Application - b2c, Mobile Marketing Magazine 2010
- Community Choice, AppCircus at DroidCon 2010
- CTIA E-Tech Award 2011, CTIA 2011
- Jury Award, Mobile Premier Awards 2011 Winners of AppCircus Events
- Most Innovative App at the Global Mobile Awards, Mobile World Congress 2012
- The People's Voice Webby Award for Experimental and Innovation 2012
- Best Startup Business, Guardian Innovation Awards 2012
- Coolest Tech Innovation, Europa Awards

== See also ==
- Gboard
- HeliBoard
- Swype
- List of most downloaded Android applications
