= HeliBoard =

Free and open-source Android keyboard

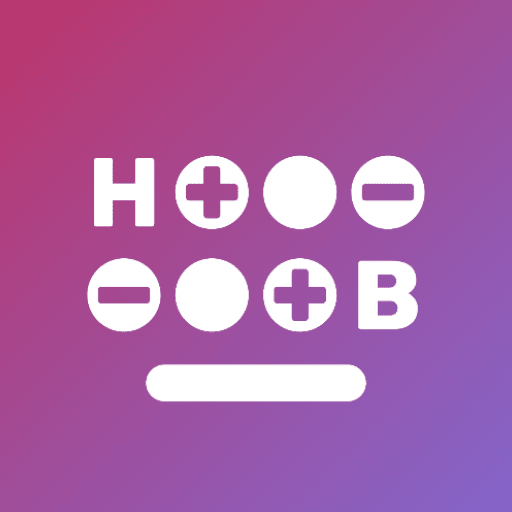
- Original author: Helium314
- Operating system: Android
- Size: 21 MB
- Type: Virtual keyboard
- License: GPL-3.0
- Website: https://github.com/HeliBorg/HeliBoard
- Repository: github.com/HeliBorg/HeliBoard

HeliBoard is a free and open-source virtual keyboard application for Android and a maintained fork of OpenBoard. OpenBoard, and subsequently Heliboard, are based on the Android Open Source Project's (AOSP) keyboard implementation. OpenBoard was initially released on 31 December 2019 and was actively developed until 17 December 2022, while HeliBoard is still in active development.

HeliBoard and OpenBoard do not contain any Google dependencies and do not connect to the internet, and are therefore used as privacy-respecting alternatives to Gboard.

HeliBoard and OpenBoard are licensed under GNU General Public License v3.0.

Both keyboards support "force incognito mode" to disable the learning of new words, autocorrect, auto-capitalize, clipboard history, delete-key swipe actions, and more. Heliboard, additionally, supports more features.
