= EurKEY =

Multilingual keyboard layout

EurKEY keyboard layout

EurKEY is a multilingual keyboard layout which is intended for Europeans, programmers and translators and was developed by Steffen Brüntjen and published under the GPL free software license. It is available for common desktop operating systems such as Windows, Mac OS X and Linux.

Since the release of xkeyboard-config version 2.12 (May 2014), a component of the X Window System, EurKEY is directly selectable in many Linux distributions without the need of installing additional packages.

== Overview ==
The original motivation behind the creation of EurKEY was to allow non-native English-speaking programmers to use the US layout, which is advantageous for programming, while still writing in their own native language without changing their keyboard layout anytime they need to write in their mother tongue. In many national layouts, for example, { and } are on the row of numbers and not on the top row of letters and thus closer to the home row.

The US layout is the base of EurKEY and these are extended with the symbolism of many European languages, special characters, the Greek alphabet, and many common mathematical symbols accessible via the AltGr key.

=== Petition of EurKEY as European standard ===
In 2017 a petition was started to promote EurKEY as a European standard. The main reasons given by the initiators are that national layouts hinders the free movement of goods (notebooks) within the European Union (1), the software is optimized for the US market and its main keyboard layout (2) and learning touch typing is made difficult by studying or working abroad (3).

=== EurKEY Colemak-DH ===
EurKEY Colemak-DH layout, ISO version

EurKEY Colemak-DH layout, ANSI version

Besides the original EurKEY, another version of it has been developed in 2020 with the aim to combine the advantages of EurKEY and ergonomic keyboard layouts. For this purpose EurKEY Colemak-DH uses Colemak (US) with the DH-Mod as basis to guarantee the ergonomics while using the design principles of EurKEY for the multilingual support. The Colemak basis should allow EurKEY Colemak-DH through its similarities to QWERTY (in symbolism besides the letters) be nearly as easy to use for programmers as the origin. Furthermore simple usability should not be reached by a big change of the shortcuts like Ctrl+Z/X/C/V. The DH-Mod takes into account the criticism, that Colemak focuses too much on the middle row keys and thus D and H can lead to awkward lateral hand movements.

==== English layout as base for Europeans ====
Colemak's improvement in ergonomics applies primarily to users who write in English. However, it is obvious that Colemak has an advantage over QWERTZ and QWERTY, at least for all other Germanic languages as well, due to their similarity. The choice of an English keyboard also makes sense as English is the most widely spoken foreign language (38% of the population) in the EU, while 54% of the EU population are able to speak at least one other language in addition to their mother tongue.
