= Finger Touching Cell Phone =

The Finger Touching Cell Phone was a concept cell-phone developed by Samsung and Sunman Kwon at Hong-ik University, South Korea.

== Concept ==
The phone was designed to be worn, as a wristband. The phone would project a 3 × 4 mobile-style keypad onto your fingers, with each joint making up a button. The product won an iF Concept Product Award in 2007.
