= Droidcon =

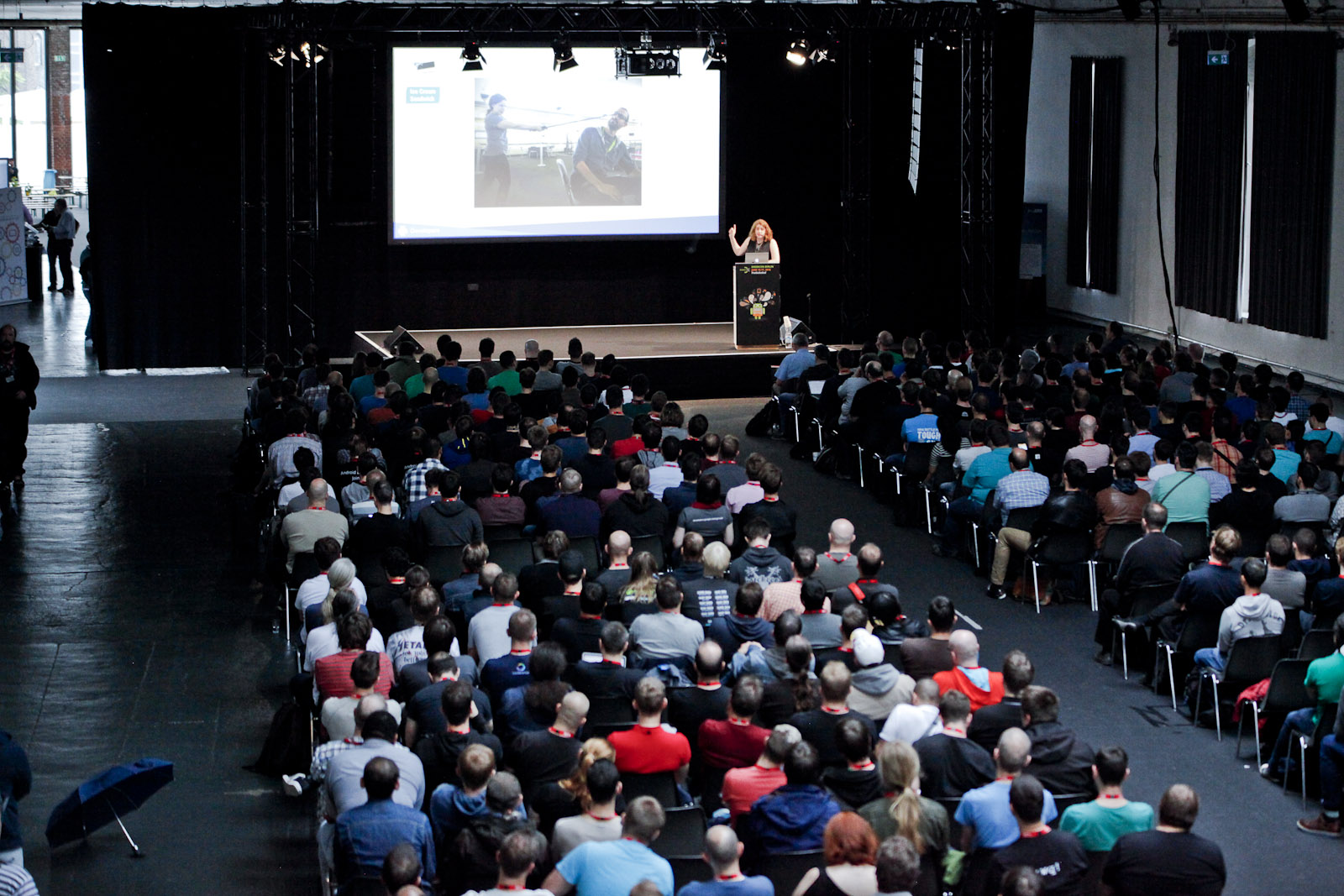
Droidcon in Berlin in 2016.

Droidcon is the franchise name for a series of community conferences in Europe, focused on software development for Google's Android smartphone framework. The droidcon conferences are the largest Android developer conferences held outside the USA.

droidcon started in 2009 in Berlin, as a grassroots effort organized by Android developers. It grew continuously and by 2015 was held in 19 countries. So far droidcon conferences took place in Berlin, London, Tunis, Bangalore, Bucharest, Amsterdam, Murcia, Brussels, Turin, Paris, Madrid, Stockholm, Tel Aviv, Moscow, Kraków, Dubai, Zagreb, Thessaloniki, Montreal and New York. Two of the largest droidcon events held so far were in London in 2022 (over 1.400 attendees) and Berlin in 2023 in combination with Fluttercon Berlin with over 2.000 attendees in total. The conferences continue to grow in size and in new locations. 2019 Droidcon edition was set to happen at [Chennai].

droidcon provides a forum for developers to network with other developers, to share techniques, to announce apps and products, and to learn and teach. The conferences open with a "bar-camp" - 5-minute presentations on topics by potential speakers. The audience votes on presentations that they'd like to see in expanded form, and these are scheduled for later in the event.

In 2010, Lucasfilm claimed the rights to the word "droid" based on its Star Wars franchise, and issued a "cease and desist" writ against droidcon. However, as of 2014, the conferences continue to be called "droidcon".
