= Virtual keyboard =

Software component

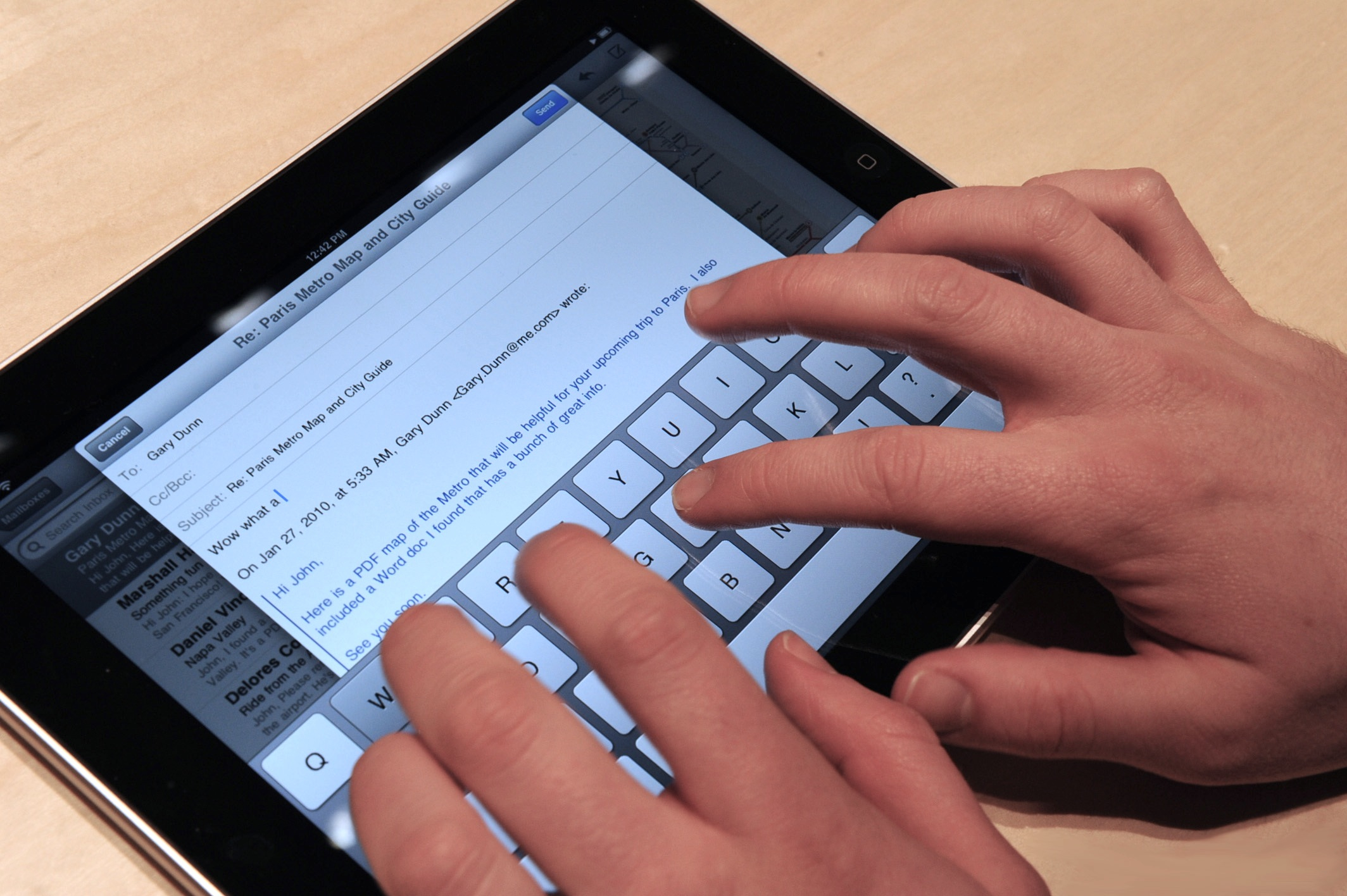
Typing on an iPad's virtual keyboard

A virtual keyboard is a software component that allows the input of characters without the need for physical keys. Interaction with a virtual keyboard happens mostly via a touchscreen interface, but can also take place in a different form when in virtual or augmented reality.

== Types ==
On a desktop computer, a virtual keyboard might provide an alternative input mechanism for users with disabilities who cannot use a conventional keyboard, for multi-lingual users who switch frequently between different character sets or alphabets, which may be confusing over time, or for users who lack a traditional keyboard.

Virtual keyboards may utilize the following:

- Virtual keyboards with touchscreen layouts or sensors
- Character variants, punctuation, and other special characters accessible through a menu, key/mouse combinations, or double/triple/long presses on sensors
- Number pad feature to facilitate typing numbers.
- Optically projected keyboard layouts or similar arrangements of "keys" or sensing areas
- Optically detected human hand and finger motions
- Multiple language sets that don't require a settings change

Various JavaScript virtual keyboards have been created on web browsers, allowing users to type their own languages on foreign keyboards. Multitouch screens allow the creation of virtual chorded keyboards for tablet computers, touchscreens, touchpads, and wired gloves.

== Mobile devices ==
Virtual keyboards are commonly used as an on-screen input method in devices with no physical keyboard where there is no room for one, such as a pocket computer, personal digital assistant (PDA), tablet computer, or touchscreen-equipped mobile phone. Text is commonly inputted either by tapping a virtual keyboard or finger-tracing. Virtual keyboards are also featured in emulation software for systems that have fewer buttons than a computer keyboard would have.

=== Historical development ===
==== PDA ====
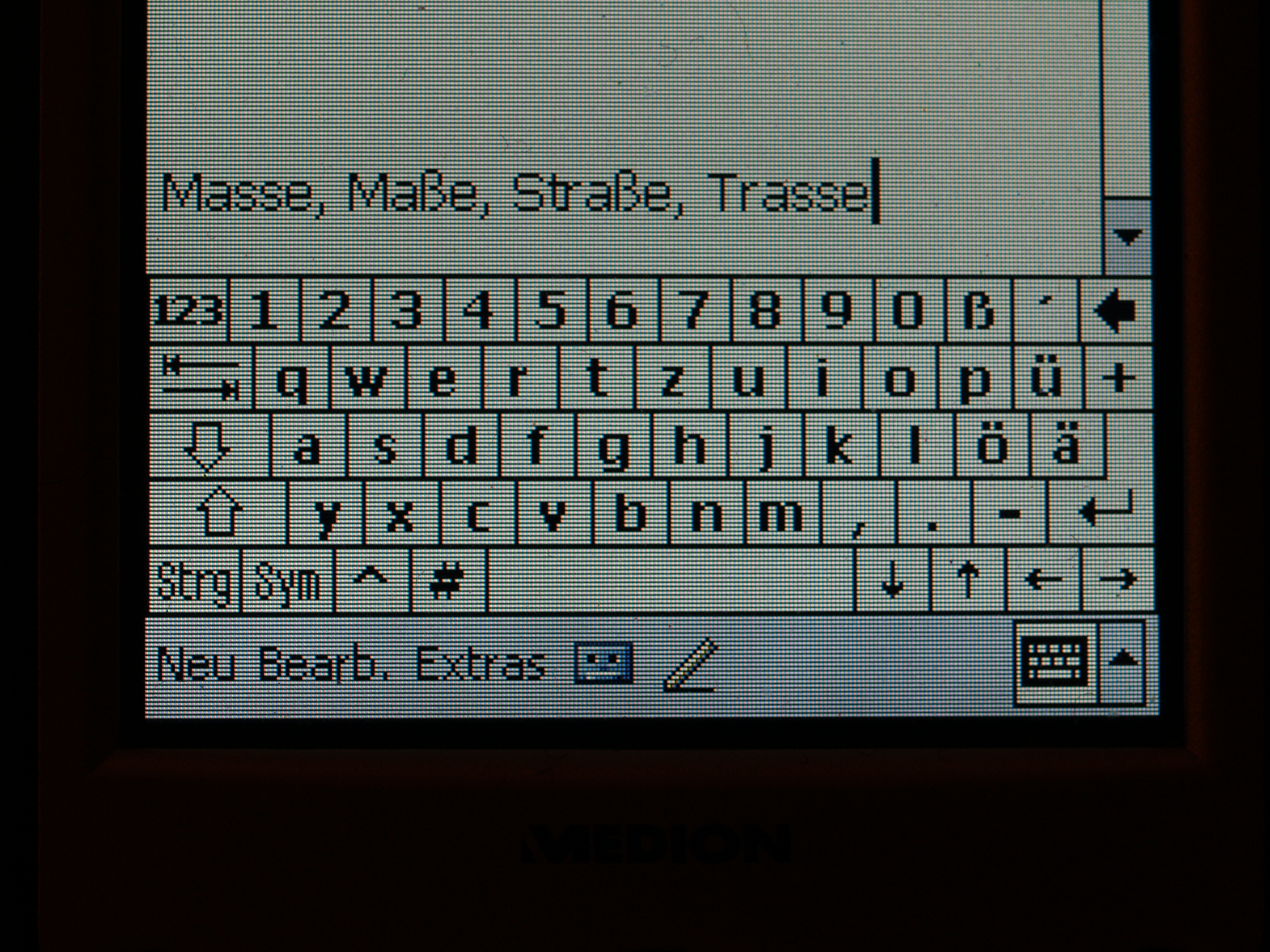
Virtual keyboard on a Pocket PC PDA

The four main approaches to entering text into a PDA were: virtual keyboards operated by a stylus, external USB keyboards, handwritten keyboards, and stroke recognition. Microsoft's mobile operating system approach was to simulate a completely functional keyboard, resulting in an overloaded layout. Without support for multi-touch technology, PDA virtual keyboards had usability constraints.

==== First iPhone ====
When Apple presented the iPhone in 2007, not including a physical keyboard was seen as a detriment. However, Apple brought the multi-touch technology into the device, overcoming the usability problems of PDAs.

== Current implementation and use ==
The most common mobile operating systems, Android and iOS, give the developer community the possibility to individually develop custom virtual keyboards.

=== Android ===
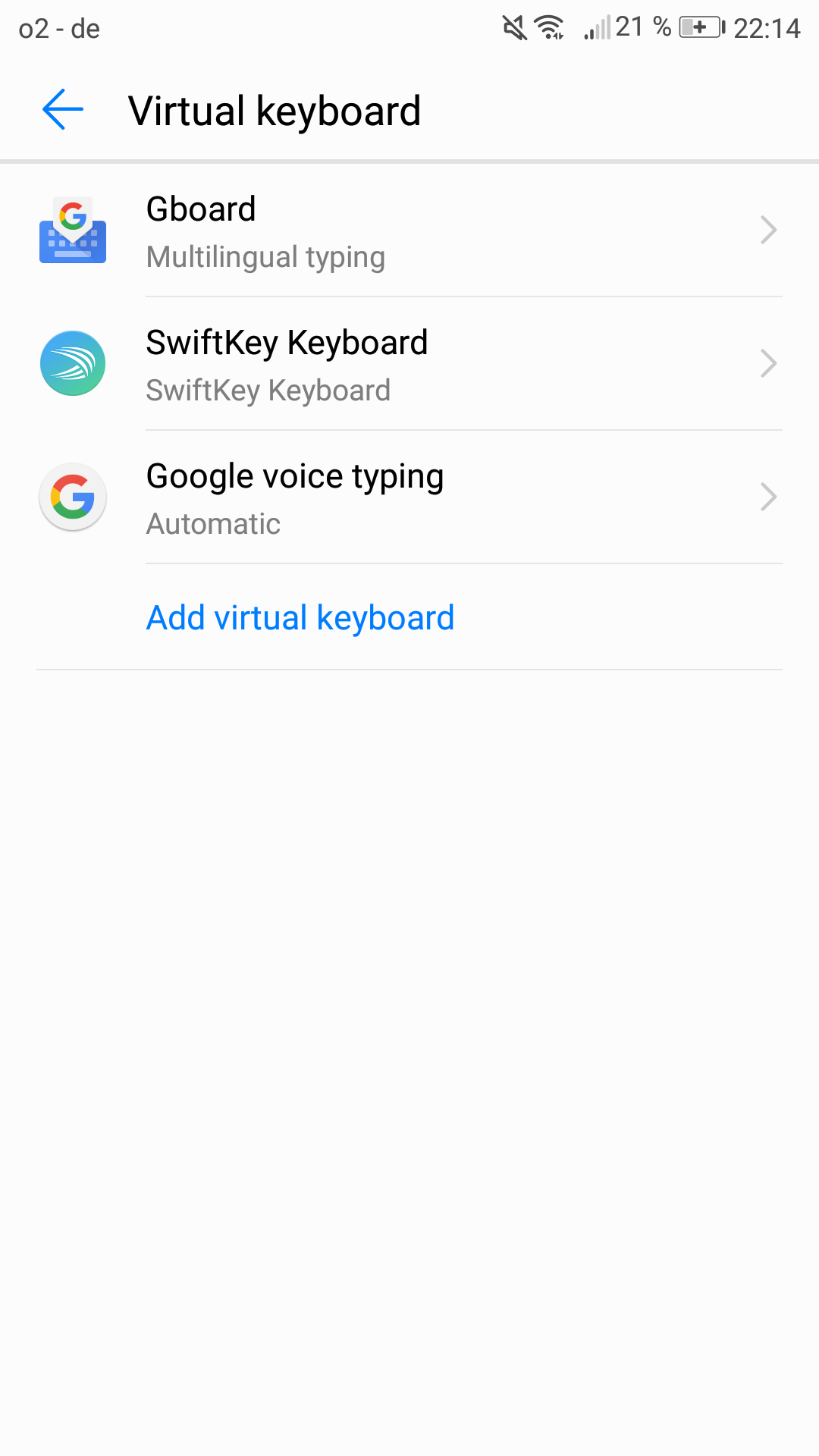
Android keyboard settings

The Android SDK provides an "InputMethodService". This service provides a standard implementation of an input method, enabling the Android development community to implement their own keyboard layouts. The InputMethodService ships with it on Keyboard View. While the InputMethodService can be used to customize key and gesture inputs, the Keyboard Class loads an XML description of a keyboard and stores the attributes of the keys.

As a result, it is possible to install different keyboard versions on an Android device, and the keyboard is only an application, most frequently downloaded among them being Gboard and SwiftKey; a simple activation over the Android settings menu is possible.

=== iOS ===
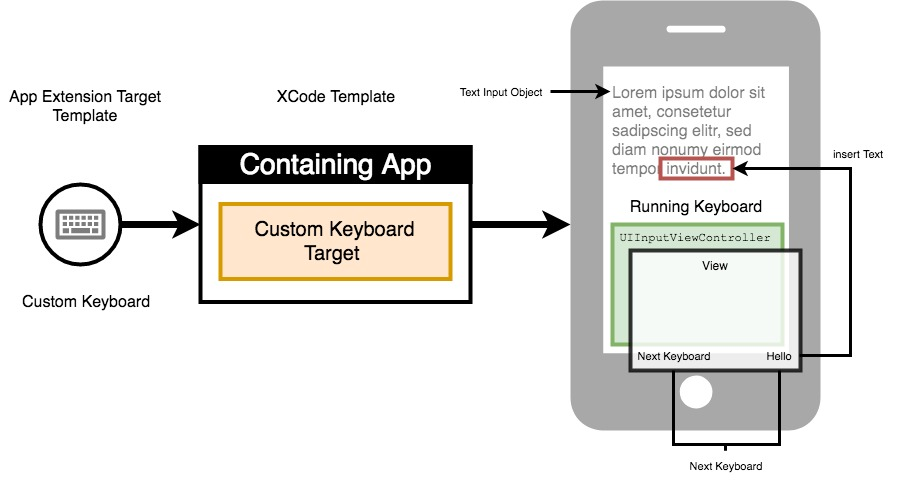
Apple iOS UIInputViewController

Apple's iOS operating system allows the development of custom keyboards; no access is given to the dictionary or general keyboard settings. iOS automatically switches between system and custom keyboards if the user enters text into the text input field.

The UIInputViewController is the primary view controller for a custom keyboard app extension. This controller provides different methods for the implementation of a custom keyboard, such as a user interface for a custom keyboard, obtaining a supplementary lexicon or changing the primary language of a custom keyboard.

=== Windows ===
Microsoft Windows provides the virtual keyboard through Common Text Framework service.

=== Word suggestions ===
Diverse scientific papers at the beginning of the 2000s showed that, even before the invention of smartphones, predicting words, based on what the user is typing, assisted in increasing the typing speed. At the beginning of development of this keyboard feature, prediction was mainly based on static dictionaries. Google implemented the prediction method in 2013 in Android 4.4. This development was mainly driven by third party keyboard providers, such as SwiftKey and Swype. In 2014 Apple presented iOS 8 which includes a new predictive typing feature called Quick Type, which displays word predictions above the keyboard as the user types.

=== Haptic feedback ===
Haptic feedback provides for tactile confirmation that a key has been successfully triggered i.e. the user hears and feels a "click" as a key is pressed. Utilizing hysteresis, the feel of a physical key can be emulated to an even greater degree. In this case, there is an initial "click" that is heard and felt as the virtual key is pressed down, but then as finger pressure is reduced once the key is triggered, there is a further "unclick" sound and sensation as if a physical key is respringing back to its original unclicked state. This behaviour is explained in Aleks Oniszczak & Scott Mackenzie's 2004 paper "A Comparison of Two Input Methods for Keypads on Mobile Devices" which first introduced haptic feedback with hysteresis on a virtual keyboard.

== Special keyboard types ==
Keyboards are needed in different digital areas. smartphones and devices that create virtual worlds, for example, virtual reality or augmented reality glasses, need to provide text input possibilities.

=== Optical virtual keyboard ===
An optical virtual keyboard was invented and patented by IBM engineers in 1992. It optically detects and analyses human hand and finger motions and interprets them as operations on a physically non-existent input device, such as a surface having painted keys. This allows it to emulate unlimited types of manually operated input devices including a mouse or a keyboard. All mechanical input units can be replaced by such virtual devices, optimized for the current application and for the user's physiology maintaining the speed, simplicity, and unambiguity of manual data input.

One example of this technology is the "Selfie Type" - a keyboard technology for mobile phones made by Samsung Electronics. It was intended to use the front-facing camera (the selfie camera) to track the user's fingers, enabling the user to type on an "invisible keyboard" on a table or another surface in front of the phone. It was introduced at the Consumer Electronics Show 2020 and was expected to be launched in the same year but never did.

=== Augmented reality keyboards ===
The basic idea of a virtual keyboard in an augmented reality environment is to give the user a text input possibility. A common approach is to render a flat keyboard into augmented reality, e.g. using the Unity TouchScreenKeyboard. The Microsoft HoloLens enables the user to point at letters on the keyboard by moving their head.

Another approach was researched by the Korean KJIST U-VR Lab in 2003. Their suggestion was to use wearables to track finger motion to replace a physical keyboard with virtual ones. They also tried to give audiovisual feedback to the user, when a key was hit. The basic idea was to give the user a more natural way to enter text, based on what he is used to.

The Magic Leap 1 from Magic Leap implements a virtual keyboard with augmented reality.

=== Virtual reality keyboards ===
The challenge, as in augmented reality, is to give the user the possibility to enter text in a completely virtual environment. Most augmented reality systems don't track the hands of the user. So many available systems provide the possibility to point at letters.

In September 2016, Google released a virtual keyboard app for their Daydream virtual reality headset. To enter text, the user points at letters using the controller.

In February 2017, Logitech presented an experimental approach to bring their keyboards into the virtual environment. The Vive Tracker and the Logitech G gaming keyboard track finger movement without wearing a glove. Fifty kits were sent to exclusive developers, enabling them, in combination with Logitech's BRIDGE developer kit, to test and experiment with the new technology.

== Security considerations ==
Virtual keyboards may be used in some cases to reduce the risk of keystroke logging. For example, Westpac's online banking service uses a virtual keyboard for password entry, as does TreasuryDirect (see picture). It is more difficult for malware to monitor the display and mouse to obtain the data entered via the virtual keyboard than it is to monitor real keystrokes. However, it is possible, for example by recording screenshots at regular intervals or upon each mouse click.

TreasuryDirect login screen, showing the virtual keyboard

Virtual keyboards may prevent keystroke inference attacks but can also act as keyloggers through telemetry and can leak sensitive information through text suggestions.

The use of an on-screen keyboard on which the user "types" with mouse clicks can increase the risk of password disclosure by shoulder surfing, because:

- An observer can typically watch the screen more easily (and less suspiciously) than the keyboard, and see which characters the mouse moves to.
- Some implementations of the on-screen keyboard may give visual feedback of the "key" clicked, e.g. by changing its color briefly. This makes it much easier for an observer to read the data from the screen. In the worst case, the implementation may leave the focus on the most recently clicked "key" until the next virtual key is clicked, thus allowing the observer time to read each character even after the mouse starts moving to the next character.
- A user may not be able to "point and click" as fast as they could type on a keyboard, thus making it easier for the observer.

== See also ==
- Caldera SoftKeyboards (1997)
- Ease of Access
- Finger Touching Cell Phone
- Input method
- Mouse keys
- Multi-touch
