= Microsoft ergonomic keyboards =

Series of ergonomic keyboards designed by Microsoft

The Microsoft Natural Ergonomic Keyboard 4000

Microsoft has designed and sold a variety of ergonomic keyboards for computers beginning with the Microsoft Natural Keyboard released in 1994, which was the company's first computer keyboard. They are typically distinguished with their "gull-wing" geometry with a split layout, prominent central arch and concave key beds. Since 2024, the product line has been licensed by Microsoft to Incase who manufactured the keyboards branded as "Incase". Between 7 and 21 October 2026 the "Designed by Microsoft" pages disappeared from the Incase website. The products seem to be discontinued although Incase has not published any official press releases about it.

== Purpose ==
In general, ergonomic keyboards are designed to keep the user's arms and wrists in a near-neutral position, which means the slant angle (the lateral rotation angle for the keys in each half relative to the axis of the home row in a conventional keyboard) is approximately 10 to 12.5°, the slope (the angle of the keytop surfaces starting from the front edge closer to the user towards the top of the keyboard, relative to a horizontal plane) is -7.5°, and the tent or gable angle of each half (the angle of the keytops from the center of the keyboard towards its left and right edges, relative to the horizontal desk surface) is 20 to 30°.

Microsoft began planning an ergonomic keyboard in 1993 with the acknowledgment of concerns regarding carpal tunnel syndrome and repetitive strain injury in the age of computing. That same year, Microsoft released the Microsoft Mouse 2.0, an ergonomic mouse. There had been a number of lawsuits at the time in the United States claiming that bad keyboard designs from manufacturers were causing injury to individuals. In August 1994, shortly before the launch of Natural Keyboard, both Microsoft and Compaq announced that they will put safety warning stickers on their keyboards. However there was no peer-reviewed evidence yet that the split-keyboard layout prevented long-term musculoskeletal injuries.

== Models comparison table ==
Microsoft ergonomic keyboards
Name	Dates		Connectivity	Features								Chassis		Notes	Ref.
Name	Intro.	Status	Connectivity	Keys	Nav/Edit cluster	Numpad	Media hotkeys	Lock status lights	F-Lock	Legs for positive tilt	Riser for negative tilt	Colors	Weight	Notes	Ref.
Natural Keyboard	1994	Discontinued	wired PS/2	104 (Note: Standard 101-key QWERTY keyboard layout with the addition of two Windows keys and a contextual menu key on the spacebar row)	3×2 (Note: Conventional 3-column, 2-row layout; columns (from left to right) are Ins/Del, Home/End, and PgUp/PgDn)	Yes	No	1, A, ⤓ (Note: 1 represents Num Lock status light, A represents ⇪ Caps Lock status light, ⤓ represents Scroll Lock status light, F represents F-Lock status light (listed in order as located on keyboard))	—N/a	No	built-in foldable	beige	1.3 kg (2.9 lb)		
Natural Keyboard Elite	1998	Discontinued	wired PS/2	104	2×3 (Note: Nonstandard 2-column, 3-row layout; columns (from left to right) are Home/End/Del and PgUp/PgDn/Ins)	Yes	No	1, A, ⤓	—N/a	Yes	No	black, white	1.1 kg (2.4 lb)	Arrow keys layout is diamond-shaped	
Natural Keyboard Pro	1999	Discontinued	wired PS/2 and USB-A (dual)	123 (Note: Adds 19 hot keys, two of which are programmable using IntelliType Pro software)	3×2	Yes	Yes	1, A, ⤓	—N/a	Yes	No	white	1.5 kg (3.3 lb)	Built-in two-port USB hub	
Natural MultiMedia Keyboard	2002	Discontinued	wired PS/2	120 (Note: Adds 17 hot keys; Ins integrated with Print Screen)	2×3(2) (Note: Nonstandard 2-column, 3-row layout; columns (from left to right) are Home/Del (double height Del) and End/PgUp/PgDn. Ins moved to PrtScrn as the secondary function activated by F-Lock)	Yes	Yes	F, A, 1	Yes	Yes	No	white	1.13 kg (2.5 lb)		
Wireless Natural MultiMedia Keyboard (Note: Originally released as part of a bundle, Wireless Optical Desktop Pro)	2002	Discontinued	wireless using USB corded receiver	120	2×3(2)	Yes	Yes	A, 1, F on receiver	Yes	Yes	No	black	1.2 kg (2.6 lb)		
Natural Ergonomic Keyboard 4000	2005	Discontinued	wired USB-A	123 (Note: Adds 16 hot keys; =, (, ) and ← Backspace duplicated above numpad)	3×2	Yes	Yes	1, A, ⤓, F	Yes	Yes	clip-on	black	1.3 kg (2.9 lb)	Zoom rocker between alphanumeric banks	
Natural Ergonomic Keyboard 7000 (Note: Originally released as part of a bundle, Natural Ergonomic Desktop 7000)	2007	Discontinued	wireless using USB receiver stick	123	3×2	Yes	Yes	No	Yes	Yes	clip-on	black	1.04 kg (2.3 lb)	Zoom rocker between alphanumeric banks	
Sculpt Ergonomic Keyboard (Note: Originally released as part of a bundle, Sculpt Ergonomic Desktop)	2013	Discontinued	wireless using USB receiver stick	84+20 (Note: Separate number pad integrates Clear in place of Num Lock and has additional 3-button row on top: Num Lock, Calculator, and ← Backspace; Calculator dublicaded on main unit)	2×4(2) (Note: Nonstandard 2-column, 4-row layout; columns (from left to right) are Del (double height Del)/Ins and Home/End/PgUp/PgDn)	separate wireless unit	Yes (Note: Media related functions are integrated via F-lock on F1—F12)	No	Yes (Note: F-Lock is implemented by sliding toggle switch. Two revisions of keyboard exist with different sets of secondary functions.)	No	clip-on magnetic	black	842 g (1.9 lb)	Split spacebar; fabric-covered palm rest	
Surface Ergonomic Keyboard	2016	In production (by Microsoft)	wireless via native Bluetooth	111 (Note: Adds 4 hot keys including Calculator above numpad; PrtScrn and additional Delete added to the end of F1–F12 row; numpad features Clear in place of Num Lock)	3×2	Yes	Yes	⤓, 1, A, F (Note: Status lights integrated into corresponding lock keys)	Yes	No	No	gray	1.01 kg (2.2 lb)	Split spacebar; Alcantara-covered palm rest, aluminium top body part	
Microsoft Ergonomic Keyboard	2019	Discontinued	wired USB-A	126 (Note: Adds 15 hot keys; PrtScrn and additional Delete added to the end of F1–F12 row; numpad features = in place of Num Lock and additional row on top: Clear, (, ) and ← Backspace; right ⊞ Win and ≣ Menu are replaced with Office and ☺)	3×2	Yes	Yes	⤓, 1, A	—N/a	No	clip-on	black	1.02 kg (2.2 lb)	Fabric-covered palm rest	
Compact Ergonomic Keyboard	2025	Never released	wireless via native Bluetooth			No						black			

== History ==
Microsoft ergonomic keyboards have gone through eight major revisions. Earlier models shipped with a 3.5" floppy disk or a CD-ROM containing the Microsoft IntelliType software. Wireless keyboards sold in bundles with a mouse would also contain the IntelliPoint software.

In 2023, Microsoft announced that it will stop manufacturing own-branded keyboards and mice as part of an effort to focus more on its premium Surface-branded accessories. However in January 2024, Microsoft announced that it would license the design and manufacturing of these products, including the Microsoft Ergonomic Keyboard and Sculpt Ergonomic Keyboard, to Tustin, California based company Incase who would continue to make and sell them. Since the transfer, around early 2025, the keyboards are now sold under the "Incase" branding but are marketed and packaged with the "Designed by Microsoft" moniker.

=== Natural Keyboard ===
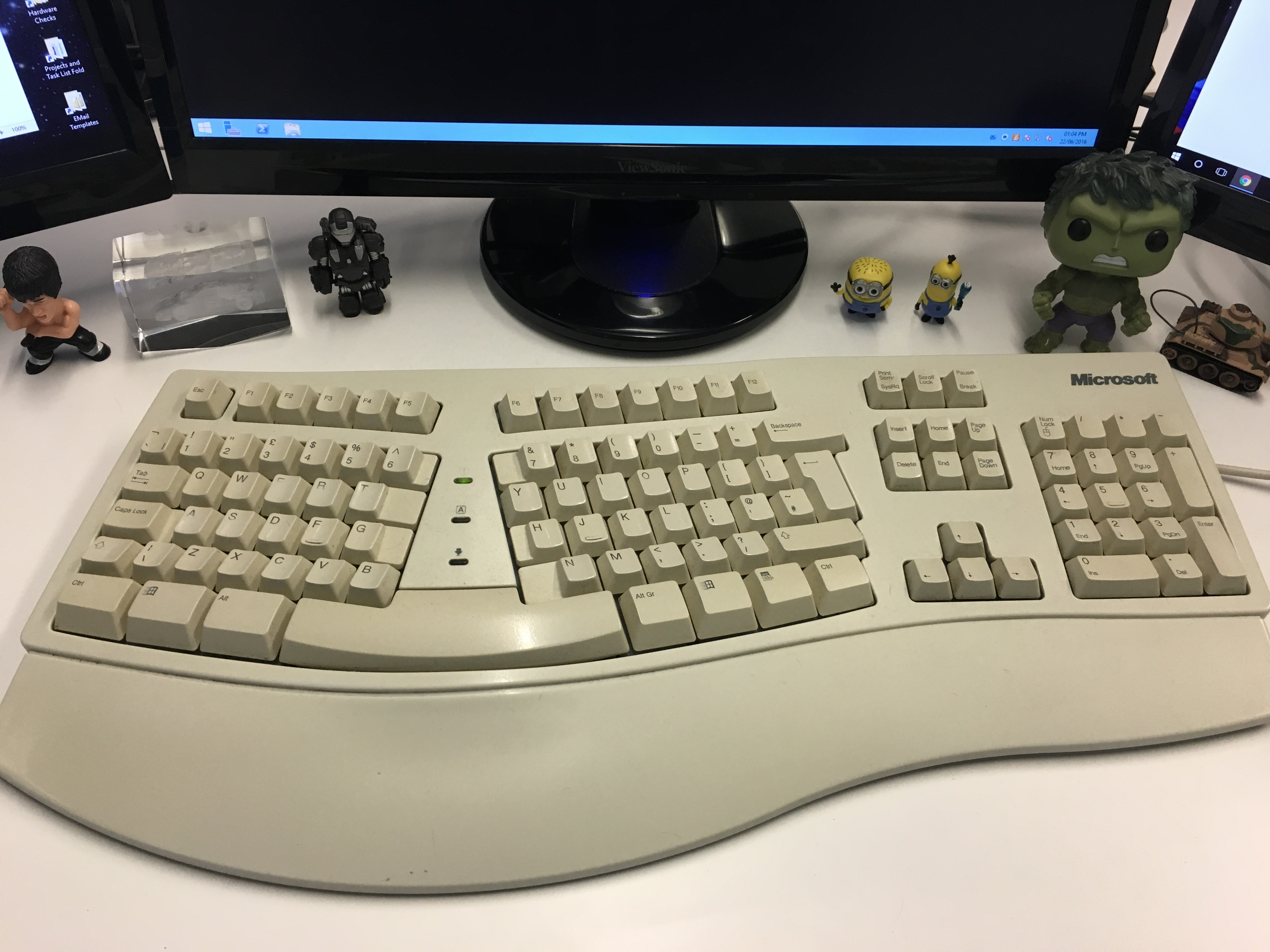
The original beige Microsoft Natural Keyboard, offered from 1994–97

The first generation of the Microsoft ergonomic keyboards, named the Natural Keyboard, was officially introduced on September 6, 1994, and released in October with a list price of US$99.99 (equivalent to $217 in 2025). It was designed for Microsoft by Ziba Design with assistance and manufacturing by Key Tronic. The Microswitch division of Honeywell, which was responsible for that company's keyboards and was acquired by Key Tronic in early 1994, is also credited with design input. The keyboard has a PS/2 connector but also shipped with an AT (5-pin DIN) adapter in the box.

The keyboard uses a fixed-split design, with each half of the alphanumeric section separated, laterally rotated, and tilted upwards and down from the center of the keyboard. This key arrangement was ergonomically designed to prevent carpal tunnel syndrome and other repetitive strain injuries associated with typing for long periods of time. Another innovation was the integrated wrist pad helping to ensure correct posture while sitting at the computer and further reducing strain on the neck, arms and wrists.

It is officially certified to work with Microsoft Windows 95 and Novell NetWare. This keyboard also introduced three new keys purposed for Microsoft's then-upcoming operating system: two Windows logo keys (⊞ Win) between the Ctrl and Alt keys on each side, and a ≣ Menu key between the right Windows and Ctrl keys. The three Num Lock/Caps Lock/Scroll Lock status lights are arranged vertically between the two halves of the alphanumeric section. Microsoft offered a software named IntelliType bundled with the keyboard, allowing Windows users customize the function keys and modify keys fairly extensively, such as enabling Caps Lock at boot, typing sound effects, and using the numeric keypad as a mouse. The Windows logo key for Windows 3.1 and NT 3.51 users would be mapped to open the Task List, made to be an easier alternative than the existing Ctrl + End combo.

Although it was not the first ergonomic keyboard, it was the first widely available sub-$100 offering. The keyboard gained popularity quickly, exceeding Microsoft's forecast of 100,000 units sold by the end of 1994. Microsoft soon asked Key Tronic to ramp up production to 100,000 per month in 1995, and the Natural Keyboard sold over 600,000 per month at its peak. Production halted by about December 1997 to prepare for its successor, the Natural Keyboard Elite, with reportedly over 3 million units of the Natural Keyboard having been sold.

=== Natural Keyboard Elite ===
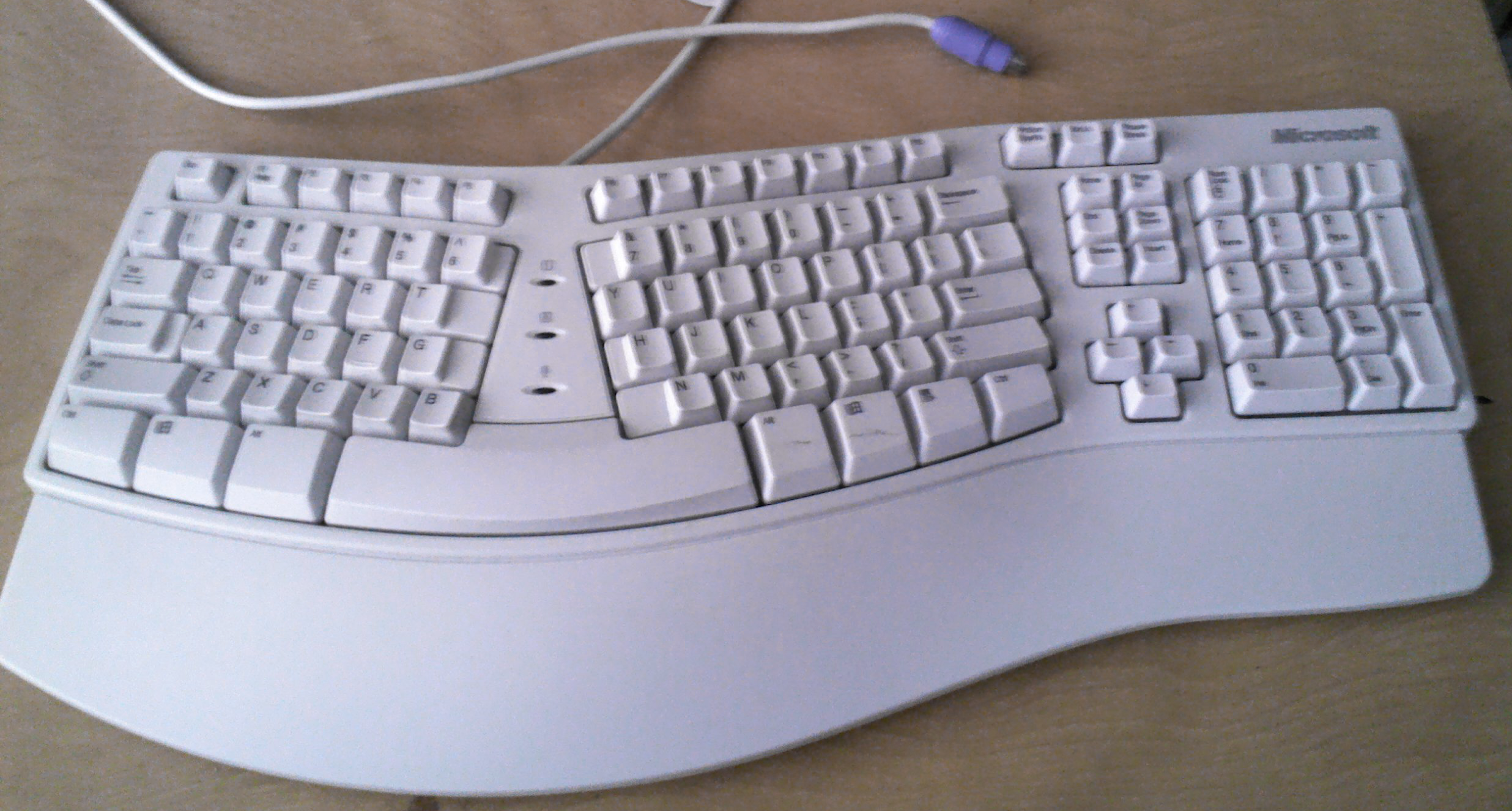
Microsoft Natural Keyboard Elite in white, the second generation ergonomic keyboard with its distinct diamond-shaped arrow keys, offered from 1998 until the mid-2000s

After the Microsoft Natural Keyboard, the company announced a successor on November 17, 1997 named Natural Keyboard Elite, released in February 1998 at a retail price of US$64.95 (equivalent to $128 in 2025). Like the original Natural Keyboard, the Elite was manufactured by Key Tronic, who also assisted in its development. The Elite has a reduced footprint (by 18%), some redesigned keycaps, and its microchip upgraded to natively support the USB protocol for modern and future systems.

The Elite features a nonstandard layout of the six-key navigation/edit key cluster normally found above the cursor keys (Ins/Del, Home/End, and PgUp/PgDn). The arrow keys' inverted-T layout has been changed into a cross-like layout, with left/right arrows keys side by side and up/down keys bracketing them from above and below, increasing the distance between the vertical keys. There had been some criticism that this layout was a tight squeeze. Another significant change was the keyboard's adjustable feet. While the original Microsoft Natural Keyboard had feet in the front to generate reverse tilt, the Elite and its next couple of successors have their feet in the back.

The Natural Keyboard Elite was manufactured in at least two different color schemes; white with black lettering and black with white lettering. After the Natural Keyboard Pro was introduced, the Elite was repositioned as an entry level model and had its price reduced to about US$45 (equivalent to $84 in 2025) MSRP. It continued to be available for several more years at discounted prices targeting bulk buyers.

=== Natural Keyboard Pro ===
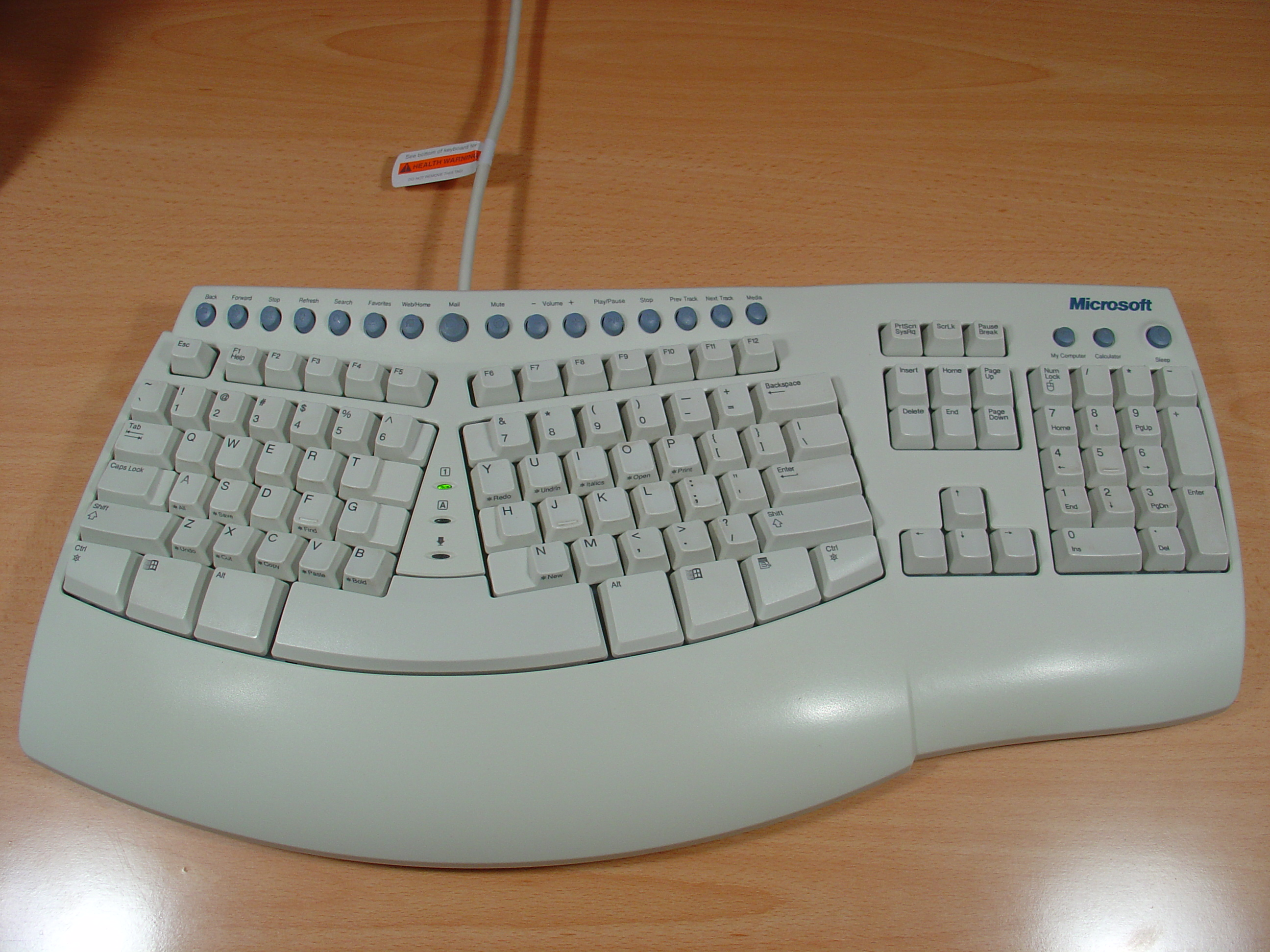
Microsoft Natural Keyboard Pro, the premier ergonomic keyboard produced from 1999 to 2002

The third iteration was the Natural Keyboard Pro, introduced on June 22, 1999 and released in October that year at a retail price of US$74.95 (equivalent to $145 in 2025). The Natural Keyboard Pro restored the standard inverted-T layout of the cursor keys and six-key nav/edit cluster 2×3 layout, following criticism of the unusual layout on the Elite. The Natural Keyboard Pro's cord has both USB and PS/2 terminals.

The most notable new features are the added row of program shortcut keys along the top edge of the keyboard (above F1 — F12 and the numeric keypad), including multimedia keys and power management keys, amid the Internet and PC multimedia hype of the late 1990s. The Natural Keyboard Pro also included an internal two-port USB hub on the side of the keyboard, designed for easily connecting other USB peripherals such as a mouse or trackball to a computer by passing through the keyboard. At the time this was a key selling point since many PCs were limited to only a single USB port. This feature was dropped in subsequent iterations of Microsoft's ergonomic keyboards.

Vista and Windows 7 have the ability to customize shortcut key behavior without additional software when using the "internet keyboard" keyboard layout. Some other modern operating systems, such as FreeBSD and most Linux distributions, have comparable configuration options.

=== Natural MultiMedia Keyboard ===
Microsoft Natural Multimedia Keyboard

In September 2002, Microsoft introduced the redesigned Natural Multimedia Keyboard (sometimes styled as MultiMedia) at a retail price of US$54.95 (equivalent to $98 in 2025). The Natural Multimedia Keyboard modernized the aesthetic look with an "Astral blue" color, reworked the row of multimedia buttons, and once again used a lightweight chassis as the Natural Keyboard Elite. It notably included the controversial F Lock feature, which originally debuted in the Microsoft Office Keyboard in 2001, to toggle from standard software-defined Fn functions.

Although the bunched arrow keys of the previous Elite model has been fixed by returning to the standard inverted T layout, the six-key nav/edit cluster has been changed to a 2x3 vertical layout, with Ins moved to the F-Lock function of PrtScn/SysRq, and Del key expanded to double height. This became a common criticism. On the Natural Multimedia Keyboard, the status indicator lights for Num lock, Scroll lock, and Caps lock were moved from between the banks of alphanumeric keys to a more traditional location above and to the right of the backspace key.

The Natural Multimedia Keyboard was manufactured in at least three different color schemes, including white with blue accents, black with silver accents, and white with black accents.

==== Wireless Natural MultiMedia Keyboard ====
The Wireless Natural MultiMedia Keyboard was introduced at the same time and was sold alongside a wireless optical mouse (the Wireless IntelliMouse Explorer) as part of a bundle product named Wireless Optical Desktop Pro, at a retail price of US$104.95 (equivalent to $188 in 2025). This keyboard is a specialized wireless version of that keyboard with a black and silver accent finish. The keyboard uses 270 MHz high frequency (HF) radio and communicates with an included USB receiver, plus an adapter was also shipped to convert the plug for use with legacy PS/2 systems. One other change in the keyboard was that the indicator lights (Num Lock/Caps Lock/Scroll Lock) were moved to the receiver rather than the keyboard to conserve battery power.

=== Natural Ergonomic Keyboard 4000 ===
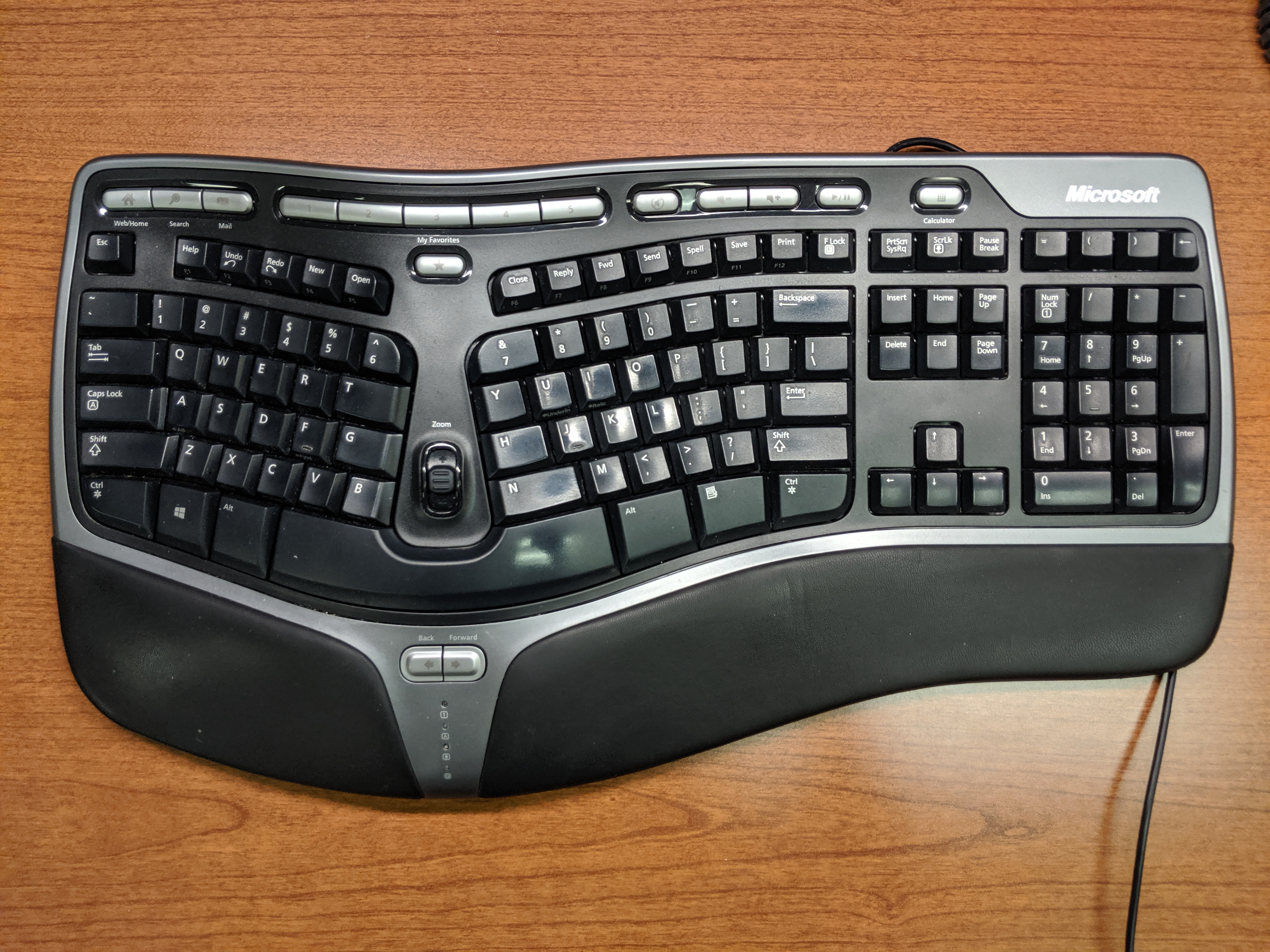
Microsoft Natural Ergonomic Keyboard 4000, released in 2005 and produced through 2020

On September 6, 2005, Microsoft introduced the Natural Ergonomic Keyboard 4000 at a retail price of US$64.95 (equivalent to $107 in 2025). This keyboard provides a significantly changed ergonomic design, including an integrated leatherette wrist rest, noticeably concave key banks, and a removable front stand to generate negative slope, which Microsoft claims to help straighten the wrist and allowing the fingers to drop naturally onto the keys. Microsoft referred to this design, with a 14-degree gable, as "gull wing".

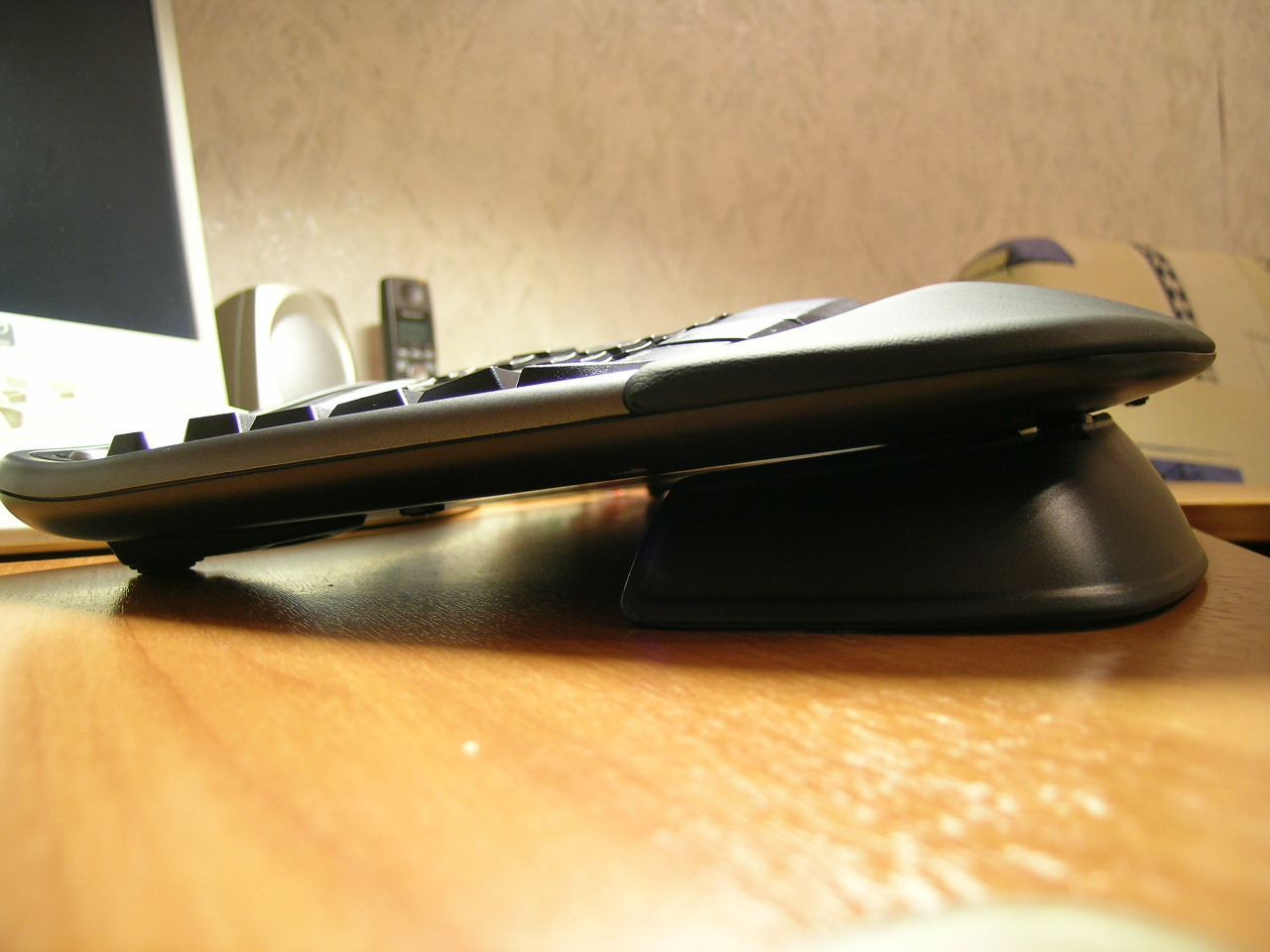
Side view, showing the snap-on front riser which generates negative slope, front-to-back

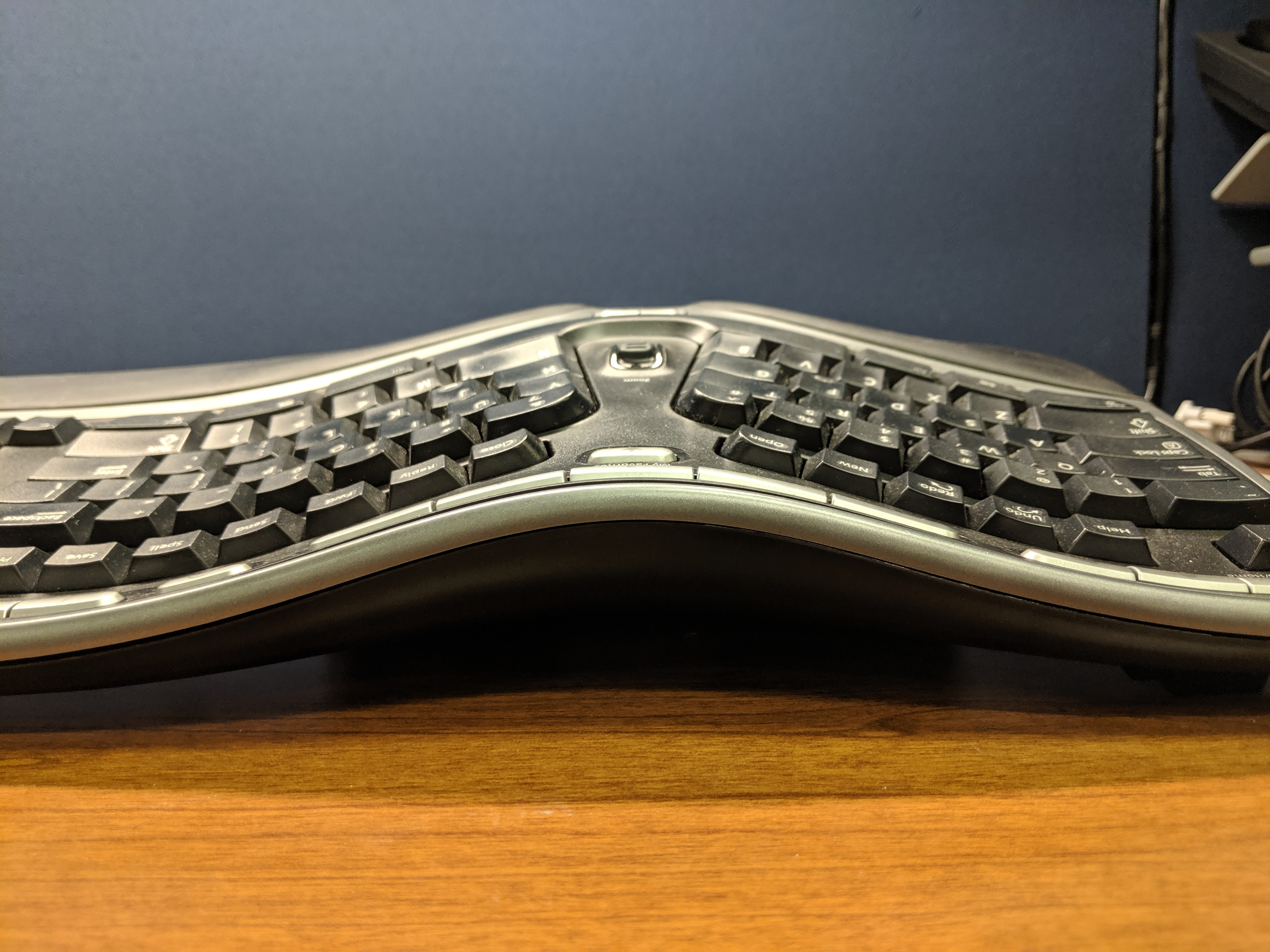
Top view, showing the tent or gable angle between the two alphanumeric halves

The multimedia keys have again been redesigned, and the six-key nav/edit cluster has been fixed by returning to the standard 3×2 horizontal rectangular layout. The F Lock key now defaults to "on", providing the original function key features rather than the new "enhanced" functions, and retains its setting across reboots. The 4000 has the indicator lights for Caps lock, etc. moved back to between the banks of keys, although they are now below the space bar, rather than above. Another new addition is a zoom slider in the middle gap of the keyboard. In 2012, the Natural Ergonomic Keyboard 4000 was revised with some cosmetic changes.

The 4000 is also significantly quieter to type on, with less of the distinctive "click clack" noise that is common with older keyboards; as it is likely uses cheaper membrane key switches (as opposed to mechanical), which tend to be quieter but have twice as much travel before depression. The space bar, however, has been reported by several reviewers to be unusually noisy and difficult to depress.

==== Natural Wireless Ergonomic Keyboard 7000 ====
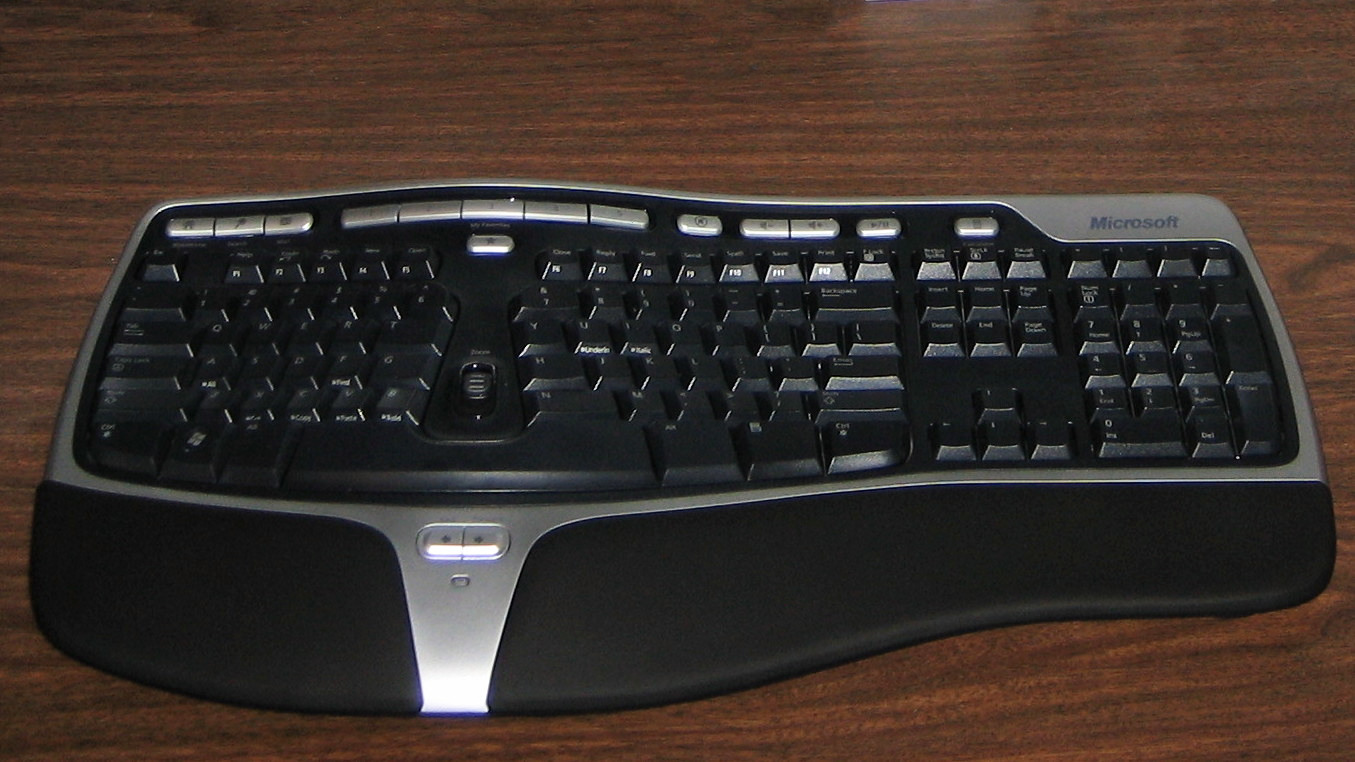
Microsoft Natural Wireless Ergonomic Keyboard 7000

On June 19, 2007, Microsoft introduced the Natural Wireless Ergonomic Keyboard 7000 as part of the Natural Ergonomic Desktop 7000 bundle, which includes a wireless mouse (the Natural Wireless Laser Mouse 7000), at a retail price of US$149.95 (equivalent to $233 in 2025). This keyboard is the wireless equivalent of the 4000, retaining the same deep 14-degree central arch and cushioned leatherette palm rest, with the main difference being the position of the status lights (Num Lock, Caps Lock, Scroll Lock, and F Lock), instead on the 7000 keyboard resides a single battery indicator light on the palm rest under the spacebar. Compared to the older 2002-era wireless keyboards, the 7000 utilizes modern and improved 2.4 GHz super high frequency (SHF) radio technology.

=== Sculpt Ergonomic keyboard ===
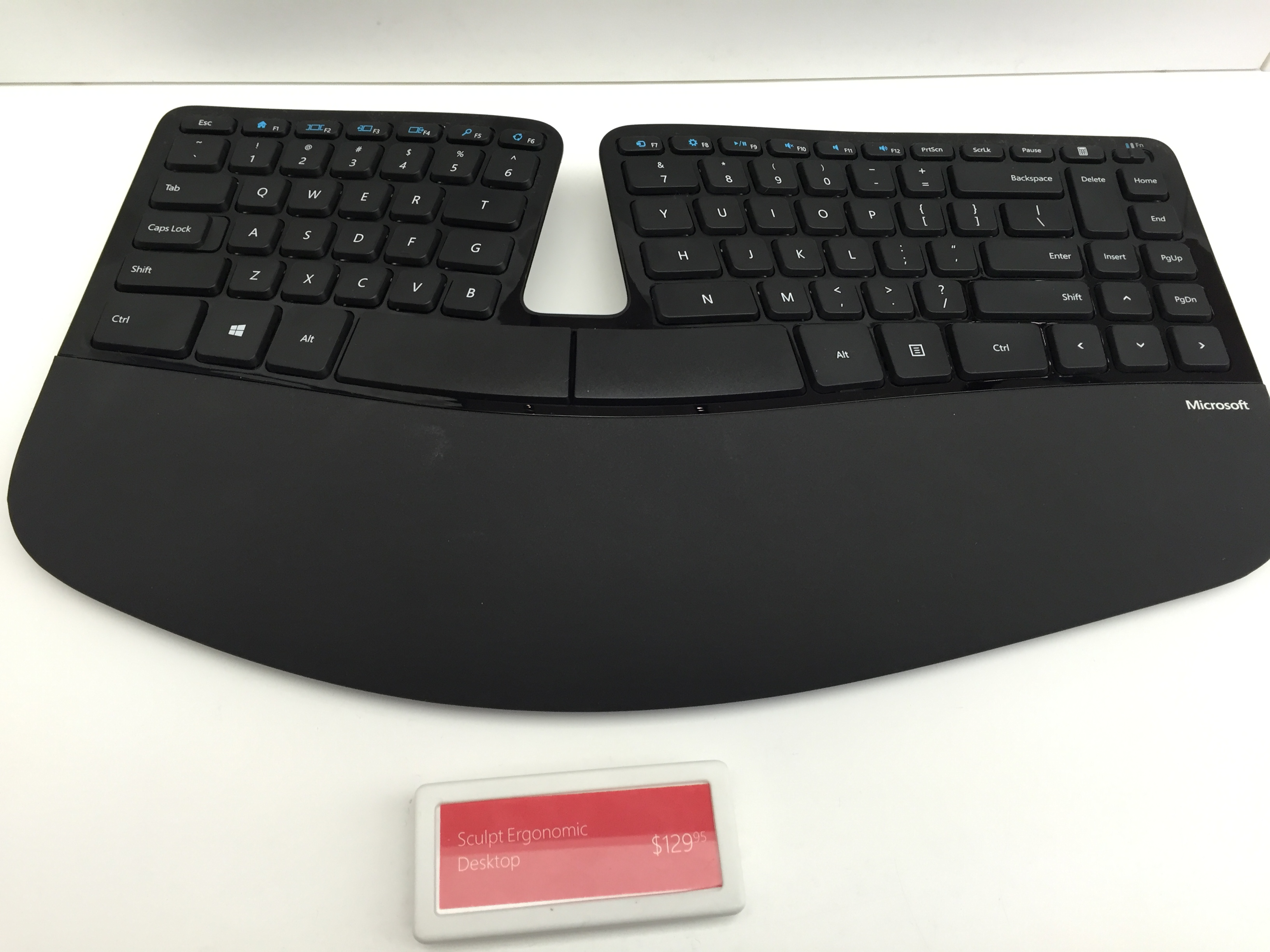
Sculpt Ergonomic Keyboard, available since 2013

Microsoft introduced the Sculpt Ergonomic keyboard on August 13, 2013 as part of the Sculpt Ergonomic Desktop bundle with a namesake optical mouse at a retail price of US$129.95 (equivalent to $180 in 2025). The keyboard was made available separately in "Business" packaging for US$80.95 (equivalent to $112 in 2025). During development, the Sculpt keyboard was codenamed "Manta Ray" for its resemblance to the animal.

A radical change compared to previous ergonomic keyboards from Microsoft, the Sculpt keyboard replaces the solid wedge with a thin, hollowed-out dome, making the keyboard significantly thinner compared to the Natural Ergonomic 4000/7000 keyboards. The Sculpt Ergonomic keyboard uses a low-profile scissor-switch mechanism and features a detached number pad. The arrangement of the six-key nav/edit cluster is nonstandard, although the arrow keys are still laid out as an inverted-T. The spacebar, for the first time, is split into two. Rather than using feet to elevate the back of the keyboard, as was the case with its predecessors, the Sculpt Ergonomic keyboard comes with a reverse-tilt riser that snaps on to the bottom front edge of the keyboard using magnets.

The Sculpt Ergonomic keyboard and mouse connect to the computer wirelessly using a 2.4 GHz radio through a proprietary USB dongle. The receiver and keyboard communicate using 128-bit AES encryption and are permanently paired at the factory. Because of this, the dongle cannot be replaced and must occupy a USB port; this feature has attracted criticism as a Bluetooth connection would free up a USB port and ensure the keyboard could still be used even if the dongle was misplaced. Microsoft state the proprietary wireless connection eliminates any delay in waking the computer.

=== Surface Ergonomic Keyboard ===
The Microsoft Surface Ergonomic keyboard was announced on October 26, 2016 at a retail price of US$129.95 (equivalent to $174 in 2025), alongside other accessories for the Surface Studio. Its scissor-switch mechanism is reworked from the Sculpt ergonomic keyboard to match the quietness of the Surface laptops, while the "gull-wing" shape from the Natural Ergonomic 4000 and 7000 keyboards returned but made into a premium and minimalist design.

The shape of the Surface Ergonomic keyboard is similar to the Sculpt, but the six-key navigation block returns to the standard two-row, three-column arrangement, and the number pad is integrated into right side of the Surface Ergonomic. The Surface is gray and the wrist pad is covered with Alcantara instead of the gloss black finish and vinyl wrist pad of the Sculpt. The Surface has also dropped the option to add the magnetic front riser for negative slope. In addition, the Surface Ergonomic is connected wirelessly over Bluetooth instead of using a proprietary dongle.

One reviewer noted the typing action of the Surface scissor switches was "more satisfying with improved quality" than the Sculpt. Paul Thurrott criticized the Surface Ergonomic keyboard for dropping the front riser option and the increased width, which extends the reach needed to use the mouse for right-handed users.

=== Microsoft/Incase Ergonomic Keyboard ===
The Microsoft Ergonomic keyboard was introduced on October 3, 2019 and is the budget-friendly successor to the 4000 keyboard. Like the 4000, it is black, wired, contains three sections (from left to right, alphanumeric, navigation, and numeric keypad), has deep-travel membrane keys (unlike the Sculpt and Surface ergonomic keyboards) and is not backlit. It loses the zoom toggle, the back/forward button under the spacebar, and the space under the function keys are gone. Instead, the Microsoft Ergonomic Keyboard introduces new Microsoft Office and emoji keys.

There is a retail version (LXM-00013) and a business version (LXN-0004).

=== Compact Ergonomic Keyboard ===
The Incase Compact Ergonomic Keyboard was announced on January 2, 2025. This keyboard was originally designed by Microsoft previously but was not released by them, and Incase inherited the blueprint. The Compact Ergonomic Keyboard has design similarities to the Sculpt but the center part is filled and the overall footprint is significantly small. It adds a Microsoft Copilot key and lacks a numerical keypad entirely. It was expected to be released in early 2025, but more than a year after announcement the product has still not been released by Incase, reportedly due to manufacturing issues.

== Reception ==
Microsoft's ergonomic keyboards have generally been well received and popular. Despite initial scepticism when the first keyboard launched, it managed to win over users and found widespread use in households, schools and offices. Until 1994's Microsoft Natural Keyboard, ergonomic keyboards were generally expensive items aimed at the medical industry. As of 2005, Microsoft have been continuously the best selling maker of ergonomic keyboards worldwide.

PCMag described the Ergonomic Keyboard 4000 in a review as being "like the keyboard we've always been waiting for." while Jon Stokes, the cofounder of Ars Technica, described the 4000 as the "Best. Keyboard. Ever.", noting his use of it on Mac OS X.

The Microsoft ergonomic keyboards have attracted a dedicated fanbase, as reported by CNBC in 2023 when some users expressed sadness that Microsoft planned its discontinuation, before the products were revived and licensed out to Incase.

In October 2026 the products completely disappeared from the Incase website without any announcement or press release. It seems the line of products has been discontinued.

== See also ==
- Ergonomic keyboard
- List of repetitive strain injury software
- Maltron
- Microsoft Mouse
- Repetitive strain injury
