= Sharp MZ character set =

Character sets for Sharp MZ computers

Sharp MZ character sets are character sets made by Sharp Corporation for Sharp MZ computers. The European and Japanese versions of the software use different character sets.

== Implementation ==
On Sharp MZ computers, there are two types of character sets: An interchange character set (called an "ASCII code" in the documentation) and a display character set. The interchange set is primarily used for keyboard input, while the display sets are primarily used for rendering text on the screen. Additionally, the European and Japanese versions of the software have different characters in each of their tables.

On MZ-700 and MZ-800 series computers, there are two distinct display character sets: the primary and alternate character tables. The alternate display table is accessible by setting a bit associated with the character in V-RAM, located in the same part of memory that controls the color and background color of the character. Characters from the alternate display character set are not supported by the BASIC interpreter and cannot be typed directly from the keyboard; instead, they can be displayed by using the BASIC command POKE. In the Japanese version, the primary set contains katakana and uppercase Latin letters, while the alternate set contains hiragana and lowercase Latin letters. In the European version, many of the characters in the primary Japanese set are replaced (including all Japanese language characters), and the lowercase Latin letters are now included in the primary set; the entire alternate Japanese set is replaced.

== European ==
=== MZ-700/MZ-800 ===
The following tables show the character sets used by European Sharp MZ-700/MZ-800 character sets. Each character is shown with a potential Unicode equivalent. Space and control characters are represented by the abbreviations for their names.

==== Interchange ====
In both the European and Japanese versions, the code points in the range 0x20 to 0x5F of the interchange character set exactly match the printable characters in the 1963 version of ASCII.

Sharp MZ-700 (European interchange)
	0	1	2	3	4	5	6	7	8	9	A	B	C	D	E	F
0x														CR		
1x	DEL	DOWN	UP	RIGHT	LEFT	HOME	CLS		INS							
2x	SP	!	"	#	$	%	&	'	(	)	*	+	,	-	.	/
3x	0	1	2	3	4	5	6	7	8	9	:	;	<	=	>	?
4x	@	A	B	C	D	E	F	G	H	I	J	K	L	M	N	O
5x	P	Q	R	S	T	U	V	W	X	Y	Z	[	\	]	↑	←
6x	🛸︎	𜰁	𜰀	🯅	𜰂	𜰃	𜰄	𜱯	😐︎	🐍︎	𜰏	𜰎	🮙	𜰐	𜰓	𜰔
7x	▒	🮍	🮌	🮎	🮏	🮜	🮝	🮟	🮞	🯔	🯕	°	␨	🯖	🯗	🢳
8x	}	┼	𜰱	𜰵	𜰹	𜰽	𜰸	𜰲	𜰶	𜰺	𜰾		𜰳	𜰷	𜰻	𜰿
9x	_	𜱂	e	`	~	𜱃	t	g	h	𜰰	b	x	d	r	p	c
Ax	q	a	z	w	s	u	i	𜱀	ö	k	f	v	𜱁	ü	ß	j
Bx	n	𜰴	Ü	m	🯐	🯑	🯒	o	l	Ä	ö	ä	🯓	y	{	𜰼
Cx	|	▐	▄	▔	▁	▏	→	▕	█	◤	🮇	├	◘	└	┐	▂
Dx	┌	┴	┬	┤	▎	▌	🮈	🮂	▀	▃	🭿	╭	╮	┘	▞	▚
Ex	🭹	♠	🭲	🭸	🭷	🭶	🭺	🭱	🭴	◣	╰	╯	🭼	╲	╱	🭽
Fx	🭾	•	🭻	♥	🭰	◢	╳	◦	♣	🭵	♦	£	↓	🭳	◥	π
Control character

==== Display ====
Sharp MZ-700 (European display, primary)
	0	1	2	3	4	5	6	7	8	9	A	B	C	D	E	F
0x	SP	A	B	C	D	E	F	G	H	I	J	K	L	M	N	O
1x	P	Q	R	S	T	U	V	W	X	Y	Z	£	└	┘	├	┴
2x	0	1	2	3	4	5	6	7	8	9	-	=	;	/	.	,
3x	🭶	🭰	🭼	🭿	🭸	🭲	🮂	▎	🭺	🭴	▄	▐	▁	▕	▂	🮇
4x	}	♠	◥	█	♦	←	♣	•	◦	?	◘	╭	╮	◣	◢	:
5x	↑	<	[	♥	]	@	◤	>	↓	\	→	▚	┌	┐	┤	┬
6x	π	!	"	#	$	%	&	'	(	)	+	*	▞	╳	╯	╰
7x	▔	▏	🭽	🭾	🭷	🭱	╱	╲	🭹	🭳	▀	▌	🭻	🭵	▃	🮈
8x	|	a	b	c	d	e	f	g	h	i	j	k	l	m	n	o
9x	p	q	r	s	t	u	v	w	x	y	z	ä	𜰰	𜰱	𜰲	𜰳
Ax	🯓	𜱀	𜱁	𜱂	`	~	𜱃	🯐	🯑	🯒	ß	ü	ö	Ü	Ä	Ö
Bx	𜰴	𜰵	𜰶	𜰷	𜰸	𜰹	𜰺	𜰻	𜰼	𜰽	𜰾	𜰿	{	┼		_
Cx	🢳	🢷 (Note: Character representing one of the cursor control characters (the cursor keys, home, and clear).)	🢵	🢶	🢴	🅷	🅲	🛸︎	𜰁	𜰀	🯅	𜰂	𜰃	𜰄	𜱯	😐︎
Dx	▒	🮍	🮌	🮎	🮏	🮜	🮝	🮟	🮞	🯔	🯕	°	␨	🯖	🯗	🐍︎
Ex	𜰅	𜰆	𜰇	𜰉	𜰋	🮙	𜰍	𜰏	𜰎	𜰐	𜰑	𜰒	𜰓	𜰔	𜰊	🮐
Fx	NBSP	𜰡	𜰢	𜰣	𜰤	𜰥	𜰦	𜰧	𜰨	𜰩	𜰪	𜰫	𜰬	𜰭	𜰮	𜰯

Sharp MZ-700 (European display, alternate)
	0	1	2	3	4	5	6	7	8	9	A	B	C	D	E	F
0x	SP	𜳖	𜳗	𜳘	𜳙	𜳚	𜳛	𜳜	𜳝	𜳞	𜳟	𜳠	𜳡	𜳢	𜳣	𜳤
1x	𜳥	𜳦	𜳧	𜳨	𜳩	𜳪	𜳫	𜳬	𜳭	𜳮	𜳯	𜱈	𜱉	𜱊	☀	𜱋
2x	𜳰	𜳱	𜳲	𜳳	𜳴	𜳵	𜳶	𜳷	𜳸	𜳹	⧉	⮺	𜱌	𜱍	𜱎	𜱏
3x	𜱐	𜱑	𜱒	𜱓	𜱔	𜱕	� (Note: Sprites for the ghost from Pac-Man. Excluded from Unicode due to intellectual property concerns. The proposal to include additional Sharp MZ characters in Unicode recommends that these characters be mapped to the Private Use Area.)	�	�	�	𜱬	𜱫	𜱮	𜱭	⬤	𜱗
4x	𜱖	𜱙	𜱘	𜱚	𜱛	𜱜	𜱝	𜱞	𜱟	𜱱	𜱰	𜱳	𜱲	𜱵	𜱷	𜱶
5x	𜱴	𜱡	𜱠	𜱣	𜱢	𜱦	𜱥	𜱨	𜱧	🛧	𜷹	𜷸	✈	↖	↙	↘
6x	↗	𜱹	𜱸	𜱻	𜱺	𜱼	𜱿	𜱾	𜱽	𜲁	𜲀	𜲃	𜲂	⏫︎	⏪︎	⏬︎
7x	⏩︎	𜲈	↕	↔	🍷︎	𜱄	𜱅	𜲉	𜲊	𜲲	𜲳	𜲶	𜲷	𜲴	𜲵	𜲸
8x	𜲹	☂	⚬	⚪︎	○	◾	◼	■	©	🞓	🞑	🞏	⛵︎	⊖	⦶	⊕
9x	🍓︎	𜲦	𜲧	𜲨	𜲩	𜲪	𜲫	𜲬	𜲭	𜲮	𜲯	𜲰	𜲱	🍎︎	💣︎	𜱩
Ax	𜱪	𜲡	𜲢	𜲣	𜲥	𜲠	γ	Σ	𜲤	λ	Ω	ω	∞	∝	√	÷
Bx	™	𜲌	⊠	☼	⊞	𜰈	𜲐	𜲑	±	𜲄	𜲅	𜲆	𜲇	🯪	🯨	🯫
Cx	🯩	𜳊	𜳋	𜳌	𜳍	𜲾	𜲿	𜳀	𜳁	𜳆	𜳇	𜳈	𜳉	𜲺	𜲻	𜲼
Dx	𜲽	𜳎	𜳏	𜳐	𜳑	𜳂	𜳃	𜳄	𜳅	𜰕	𜰗	𜰖	𜰘	𜰜	𜰛	𜰝
Ex	𜰞	𜰙	𜰚	Æ	½	¼	⅓	⅔	≥	≤	𜳒	𜳓	𜳔	𜳕	𜱆	𜱇
Fx	𜲒	𜲓	𜲔	𜲕	𜲖	𜲘	𜲚	𜲗	𜲙	𜲞	𜲟	🏢︎	⛶	≠	⌠	⌡
Excluded from Unicode due to intellectual property concerns

=== MZ-80K ===
==== Interchange ====
The MZ-80K's European interchange character set is extremely similar to the MZ-700/MZ-800 European interchange character set, differing only at 0x80, 0x8B, 0x90, 0x93, 0x94, 0xBE, and 0xC0.

Sharp MZ-80K (European interchange)
	0	1	2	3	4	5	6	7	8	9	A	B	C	D	E	F
0x														CR		
1x	DEL	DOWN	UP	RIGHT	LEFT	HOME	CLS		INS							
2x	SP	!	"	#	$	%	&	'	(	)	*	+	,	-	.	/
3x	0	1	2	3	4	5	6	7	8	9	:	;	<	=	>	?
4x	@	A	B	C	D	E	F	G	H	I	J	K	L	M	N	O
5x	P	Q	R	S	T	U	V	W	X	Y	Z	[	\	]	↑	←
6x	🛸︎	𜰁	𜰀	🯅	𜰂	𜰃	𜰄	𜱯	😐︎	🐍︎	𜰏	𜰎	🮙	𜰐	𜰓	𜰔
7x	▒	🮍	🮌	🮎	🮏	🮜	🮝	🮟	🮞	🯔	🯕	°	␨	🯖	🯗	🢳
8x	NBSP	┼	𜰱	𜰵	𜰹	𜰽	𜰸	𜰲	𜰶	𜰺	𜰾	👃︎	𜰳	𜰷	𜰻	𜰿
9x	👁︎	𜱂	e	🮙	🮘	𜱃	t	g	h	𜰰	b	x	d	r	p	c
Ax	q	a	z	w	s	u	i	𜱀	ö	k	f	v	𜱁	ü	ß	j
Bx	n	𜰴	Ü	m	🯐	🯑	🯒	o	l	Ä	ö	ä	🯓	y	¥	𜰼
Cx	NBSP	▐	▄	▔	▁	▏	→	▕	█	◤	🮇	├	◘	└	┐	▂
Dx	┌	┴	┬	┤	▎	▌	🮈	🮂	▀	▃	🭿	╭	╮	┘	▞	▚
Ex	🭹	♠	🭲	🭸	🭷	🭶	🭺	🭱	🭴	◣	╰	╯	🭼	╲	╱	🭽
Fx	🭾	•	🭻	♥	🭰	◢	╳	◦	♣	🭵	♦	£	↓	🭳	◥	π
Control character Differs from MZ-700/MZ-800 character set

==== Display ====
The MZ-80K's European display character set is extremely similar to the MZ-700/MZ-800 European primary display character set, differing only at 0x40, 0x80, 0xA4, 0xA5, 0xBC, 0xBE, 0xBF, and 0xE5. (0xDC differs in appearance, but semantically remains the symbol for delete.)

Sharp MZ-80K (European display)
	0	1	2	3	4	5	6	7	8	9	A	B	C	D	E	F
0x	SP	A	B	C	D	E	F	G	H	I	J	K	L	M	N	O
1x	P	Q	R	S	T	U	V	W	X	Y	Z	£	└	┘	├	┴
2x	0	1	2	3	4	5	6	7	8	9	-	=		/	.	,
3x	🭶	🭰	🭼	🭿	🭸	🭲	🮂	▎	🭺	🭴	▄	▐	▁	▕	▂	🮇
4x	NBSP	♠	◥	█	♦	←	♣	•	◦	?	◘	╭	╮	◣	◢	
5x	↑	<	[	♥	]	@	◤	>	↓	\	→	▚	┌	┐	┤	┬
6x	π	!	"		$	%	&	'	(	)	+		▞	╳	╯	╰
7x	▔	▏	🭽	🭾	🭷	🭱	╱	╲	🭹	🭳	▀	▌	🭻	🭵	▃	🮈
8x	NBSP	a	b	c	d	e	f	g	h	i	j	k	l	m	n	o
9x	p	q	r	s	t	u	v	w	x	y	z	ä	𜰰	𜰱	𜰲	𜰳
Ax	🯓	𜱀	𜱁	𜱂	🮙	🮘	𜱃	🯐	🯑	🯒	ß	ü	ö	Ü	Ä	Ö
Bx	𜰴	𜰵	𜰶	𜰷	𜰸	𜰹	𜰺	𜰻	𜰼	𜰽	𜰾	𜰿	¥	┼	👃︎	👁︎
Cx	🢳	🢷 (Note: Character representing one of the cursor control characters (the cursor keys, home, and clear).)	🢵	🢶	🢴	🅷	🅲	🛸︎	𜰁	𜰀	🯅	𜰂	𜰃	𜰄	𜱯	😐︎
Dx	▒	🮍	🮌	🮎	🮏	🮜	🮝	🮟	🮞	🯔	🯕	°	␧	🯖	🯗	🐍︎
Ex	𜰅	𜰆	𜰇	𜰉	𜰋	𜰌	𜰍	𜰏	𜰎	𜰐	𜰑	𜰒	𜰓	𜰔	𜰊	🮐
Fx	NBSP	𜰡	𜰢	𜰣	𜰤	𜰥	𜰦	𜰧	𜰨	𜰩	𜰪	𜰫	𜰬	𜰭	𜰮	𜰯
Differs from MZ-700/MZ-800 character set

=== MZ-80A ===
==== Interchange ====
The MZ-80A's European interchange character set is extremely similar to the MZ-700/MZ-800 European interchange character set, differing only at 0x6C, 0x6D, 0x7F and 0x90.

Sharp MZ-80A (European interchange)
	0	1	2	3	4	5	6	7	8	9	A	B	C	D	E	F
0x														CR		
1x	DEL	DOWN	UP	RIGHT	LEFT	HOME	CLS		INS							
2x	SP	!	"	#	$	%	&	'	(	)	*	+	,	-	.	/
3x	0	1	2	3	4	5	6	7	8	9	:	;	<	=	>	?
4x	@	A	B	C	D	E	F	G	H	I	J	K	L	M	N	O
5x	P	Q	R	S	T	U	V	W	X	Y	Z	[	\	]	↑	←
6x	🛸︎	𜰁	𜰀	🯅	𜰂	𜰃	𜰄	𜱯	😐︎	🐍︎	𜰏	𜰎	𜰐	𜰑	𜰓	𜰔
7x	▒	🮍	🮌	🮎	🮏	🮜	🮝	🮟	🮞	🯔	🯕	°	␨	🯖	🯗	🢳
8x	}	┼	𜰱	𜰵	𜰹	𜰽	𜰸	𜰲	𜰶	𜰺	𜰾		𜰳	𜰷	𜰻	𜰿
9x	‾	𜱂	e	`	~	𜱃	t	g	h	𜰰	b	x	d	r	p	c
Ax	q	a	z	w	s	u	i	𜱀	ö	k	f	v	𜱁	ü	ß	j
Bx	n	𜰴	Ü	m	🯐	🯑	🯒	o	l	Ä	ö	ä	🯓	y	{	𜰼
Cx	|	▐	▄	▔	▁	▏	→	▕	█	◤	🮇	├	◘	└	┐	▂
Dx	┌	┴	┬	┤	▎	▌	🮈	🮂	▀	▃	🭿	╭	╮	┘	▞	▚
Ex	🭹	♠	🭲	🭸	🭷	🭶	🭺	🭱	🭴	◣	╰	╯	🭼	╲	╱	🭽
Fx	🭾	•	🭻	♥	🭰	◢	╳	◦	♣	🭵	♦	£	↓	🭳	◥	π
Control character Differs from MZ-700/MZ-800 character set

==== Display ====
The MZ-80A's European display character set is extremely similar to the MZ-700/MZ-800 European primary display character set, differing only at 0xBF, 0xE5 and 0xF0.

Sharp MZ-80A (European display)
	0	1	2	3	4	5	6	7	8	9	A	B	C	D	E	F
0x	SP	A	B	C	D	E	F	G	H	I	J	K	L	M	N	O
1x	P	Q	R	S	T	U	V	W	X	Y	Z	£	└	┘	├	┴
2x	0	1	2	3	4	5	6	7	8	9	-	=	;	/	.	,
3x	🭶	🭰	🭼	🭿	🭸	🭲	🮂	▎	🭺	🭴	▄	▐	▁	▕	▂	🮇
4x	}	♠	◥	█	♦	←	♣	•	◦	?	◘	╭	╮	◣	◢	:
5x	↑	<	[	♥	]	@	◤	>	↓	\	→	▚	┌	┐	┤	┬
6x	π	!	"	#	$	%	&	'	(	)	+	*	▞	╳	╯	╰
7x	▔	▏	🭽	🭾	🭷	🭱	╱	╲	🭹	🭳	▀	▌	🭻	🭵	▃	🮈
8x	|	a	b	c	d	e	f	g	h	i	j	k	l	m	n	o
9x	p	q	r	s	t	u	v	w	x	y	z	ä	𜰰	𜰱	𜰲	𜰳
Ax	🯓	𜱀	𜱁	𜱂	`	~	𜱃	🯐	🯑	🯒	ß	ü	ö	Ü	Ä	Ö
Bx	𜰴	𜰵	𜰶	𜰷	𜰸	𜰹	𜰺	𜰻	𜰼	𜰽	𜰾	𜰿	{	┼		‾
Cx	🢳	🢷 (Note: Character representing one of the cursor control characters (the cursor keys, home, and clear).)	🢵	🢶	🢴	🅷	🅲	🛸︎	𜰁	𜰀	🯅	𜰂	𜰃	𜰄	𜱯	😐︎
Dx	▒	🮍	🮌	🮎	🮏	🮜	🮝	🮟	🮞	🯔	🯕	°	␨	🯖	🯗	🐍︎
Ex	𜰅	𜰆	𜰇	𜰉	𜰋	🮘	𜰍	𜰏	𜰎	𜰐	𜰑	𜰒	𜰓	𜰔	𜰊	🮐
Fx	🮙	𜰡	𜰢	𜰣	𜰤	𜰥	𜰦	𜰧	𜰨	𜰩	𜰪	𜰫	𜰬	𜰭	𜰮	𜰯
Differs from MZ-700/MZ-800 character set

=== MZ-80B ===
The code points in the range 0x20 to 0x7E mostly match the printable characters in ASCII; however, 0x5F is an overline instead of an underscore. Likewise, 0xA0 to 0x7E are the inverse video counterparts of these characters.

Sharp MZ-80B (European)
	0	1	2	3	4	5	6	7	8	9	A	B	C	D	E	F
0x	NULL	DOWN	UP	RIGHT	LEFT	HOME	CLR	DEL	INST	GRPH	SFT; LOCK	BREAK	RVS	CR	L SCRIPT	RVS; CANCEL
1x	F1	F2	F3	F4	F5	F6	F7	F8	F9	F10	00	TAB				▒
2x	SP	!	"		$	%	&	'	(	)		+	,	-	.	/
3x	0	1	2	3	4	5	6	7	8	9			<	=	>	?
4x	@	A	B	C	D	E	F	G	H	I	J	K	L	M	N	O
5x	P	Q	R	S	T	U	V	W	X	Y	Z	[	\	]	^	‾
6x	`	a	b	c	d	e	f	g	h	i	j	k	l	m	n	o
7x	p	q	r	s	t	u	v	w	x	y	z	{	|	}	~	↴
8x	║	↓	↑	→	←	♠	♥	♦	♣	╞	╡	╥	╨	╬	╪	╫
9x	═	¥	£	•	◦	┐	┘	┌	└	┼	│	─	┴	┬	┤	├
Ax	█	!	"		$	%	&	'	(	)		+	,	-	.	/
Bx	0	1	2	3	4	5	6	7	8	9			<	=	>	?
Cx	@	A	B	C	D	E	F	G	H	I	J	K	L	M	N	O
Dx	P	Q	R	S	T	U	V	W	X	Y	Z	[	\	]	^	‾
Ex	`	a	b	c	d	e	f	g	h	i	j	k	l	m	n	o
Fx	p	q	r	s	t	u	v	w	x	y	z	{	|	}	~	π
Control character Inverse video

== Japanese ==
=== MZ-700/MZ-800 ===
The following tables show the character sets used by Japanese Sharp MZ-700/MZ-800 character sets. Each character is shown with a potential Unicode equivalent. Space and control characters are represented by the abbreviations for their names.

==== Interchange ====
In both the European and Japanese versions, the code points in the range 0x20 to 0x5F of the interchange character set exactly match the printable characters in the 1963 version of ASCII.

Sharp MZ-700 (Japanese interchange)
	0	1	2	3	4	5	6	7	8	9	A	B	C	D	E	F
0x														CR		
1x	DEL	DOWN	UP	RIGHT	LEFT	HOME	CLS		INS							
2x	SP	!	"		$	%	&	'	(	)		+	,	-	.	/
3x	0	1	2	3	4	5	6	7	8	9			<	=	>	?
4x	@	A	B	C	D	E	F	G	H	I	J	K	L	M	N	O
5x	P	Q	R	S	T	U	V	W	X	Y	Z	[	\	]	↑	←
6x	🛸︎	𜰁	𜰀	🯅	𜰂	𜰃	𜰄	𜱯	😐︎	🐍︎	𜰏	𜰎	𜰐	𜰑	𜰓	𜰔
7x	日	月	火	水	木	金	土	生	年	時	分	秒	円	¥	£	🢳
8x	↓	。	「	」	、	・	ヲ	ァ	ィ	ゥ	ェ	ォ	ャ	ュ	ョ	ッ
9x	ー	ア	イ	ウ	エ	オ	カ	キ	ク	ケ	コ	サ	シ	ス	セ	ソ
Ax	タ	チ	ツ	テ	ト	ナ	ニ	ヌ	ネ	ノ	ハ	ヒ	フ	ヘ	ホ	マ
Bx	ミ	ム	メ	モ	ヤ	ユ	ヨ	ラ	リ	ル	レ	ロ	ワ	ン	゛	゜
Cx	→	▐	▄	▔	▁	▏	🮐	▕	█	◤	🮇	├	◘	└	┐	▂
Dx	┌	┴	┬	┤	▎	▌	🮈	🮂	▀	▃	🭿	╭	╮	┘	▞	▚
Ex	🭹	♠	🭲	🭸	🭷	🭶	🭺	🭱	🭴	◣	╰	╯	🭼	╲	╱	🭽
Fx	🭾	•	🭻	♥	🭰	◢	╳	◦	♣	🭵	♦	┼	🮌	🭳	◥	π
Control character

==== Display ====
Sharp MZ-700 (Japanese display, primary)
	0	1	2	3	4	5	6	7	8	9	A	B	C	D	E	F
0x	SP	A	B	C	D	E	F	G	H	I	J	K	L	M	N	O
1x	P	Q	R	S	T	U	V	W	X	Y	Z	┼	└	┘	├	┴
2x	0	1	2	3	4	5	6	7	8	9	-	=		/	.	,
3x	🭶	🭰	🭼	🭿	🭸	🭲	🮂	▎	🭺	🭴	▄	▐	▁	▕	▂	🮇
4x	→	♠	◥	█	♦	←	♣	•	◦	?	◘	╭	╮	◣	◢	
5x	↑	<	[	♥	]	@	◤	>	🮌	\	▒	▚	┌	┐	┤	┬
6x	π	!	"		$	%	&	'	(	)	+		▞	╳	╯	╰
7x	▔	▏	🭽	🭾	🭷	🭱	╱	╲	🭹	🭳	▀	▌	🭻	🭵	▃	🮈
8x	↓	チ	コ	ソ	シ	イ	ハ	キ	ク	ニ	マ	ノ	リ	モ	ミ	ラ
9x	セ	タ	ス	ト	カ	ナ	ヒ	テ	サ	ン	ツ	ロ	ケ	「	ァ	ャ
Ax	ワ	ヌ	フ	ア	ウ	エ	オ	ヤ	ユ	ヨ	ホ	ヘ	レ	メ	ル	ネ
Bx	ム	」	ィ	ュ	ヲ	、	ゥ	ョ	゜	・	ェ	ッ	゛	。	ォ	ー
Cx	🢳	🢷 (Note: Character representing one of the cursor control characters (the cursor keys, home, and clear).)	🢵	🢶	🢴	🅷	🅲	🛸︎	𜰁	𜰀	🯅	𜰂	𜰃	𜰄	𜱯	😐︎
Dx	日	月	火	水	木	金	土	生	年	時	分	秒	円	¥	£	🐍︎
Ex	𜰅	𜰆	𜰇	𜰉	𜰋	𜰌	𜰍	𜰏	𜰎	𜰐	𜰑	𜰒	𜰓	𜰔	𜰊	🮐
Fx	NBSP	𜰡	𜰢	𜰣	𜰤	𜰥	𜰦	𜰧	𜰨	𜰩	𜰪	𜰫	𜰬	𜰭	𜰮	𜰯

Sharp MZ-700 (Japanese display, alternate)
	0	1	2	3	4	5	6	7	8	9	A	B	C	D	E	F
0x	SP	a	b	c	d	e	f	g	h	i	j	k	l	m	n	o
1x	p	q	r	s	t	u	v	w	x	y	z	┼	└	┘	├	┴
2x	0	1	2	3	4	5	6	7	8	9	-	=		/	.	,
3x	🭶	🭰	🭼	🭿	🭸	🭲	🮂	▎	🭺	🭴	▄	▐	▁	▕	▂	🮇
4x	→	♠	◥	█	♦	←	♣	•	◦	?	◘	╭	╮	◣	◢	
5x	↑	<	[	♥	]	@	◤	>	🮌	\	▒	▚	┌	┐	┤	┬
6x	π	!	"		$	%	&	'	(	)	+		▞	╳	╯	╰
7x	▔	▏	🭽	🭾	🭷	🭱	𜰟	𜰠	🭹	🭳	▀	▌	🭻	🭵	▃	🮈
8x	↓	ち	こ	そ	し	い	は	き	く	に	ま	の	り	も	み	ら
9x	せ	た	す	と	か	な	ひ	て	さ	ん	つ	ろ	け	「	ぁ	ゃ
Ax	わ	ぬ	ふ	あ	う	え	お	や	ゆ	よ	ほ	へ	れ	め	る	ね
Bx	む	」	ぃ	ゅ	を	、	ぅ	ょ	゜	・	ぇ	っ	゛	。	ぉ	ー
Cx	🢳	🢷	🢵	🢶	🢴	🅷	🅲	🛸︎	𜰁	𜰀	🯅	𜰂	𜰃	𜰄	𜱯	😐︎
Dx	日	月	火	水	木	金	土	生	年	時	分	秒	円	¥	£	🐍︎
Ex	𜰅	𜰆	𜰇	𜰉	𜰋	𜰌	𜰍	𜰏	𜰎	𜰐	𜰑	𜰒	𜰓	𜰔	𜰊	🮐
Fx	NBSP	𜰡	𜰢	𜰣	𜰤	𜰥	𜰦	𜰧	𜰨	𜰩	𜰪	𜰫	𜰬	𜰭	𜰮	𜰯

=== MZ-80 series ===
==== Interchange ====
The MZ-80 series' Japanese interchange character set is extremely similar to the MZ-700/MZ-800 Japanese interchange character set, differing only at 0x80 and 0xC0.

Sharp MZ-80 series (Japanese interchange)
	0	1	2	3	4	5	6	7	8	9	A	B	C	D	E	F
0x														CR		
1x	DEL	DOWN	UP	RIGHT	LEFT	HOME	CLS		INS							
2x	SP	!	"		$	%	&	'	(	)		+	,	-	.	/
3x	0	1	2	3	4	5	6	7	8	9			<	=	>	?
4x	@	A	B	C	D	E	F	G	H	I	J	K	L	M	N	O
5x	P	Q	R	S	T	U	V	W	X	Y	Z	[	\	]	↑	←
6x	🛸︎	𜰁	𜰀	🯅	𜰂	𜰃	𜰄	𜱯	😐︎	🐍︎	𜰏	𜰎	𜰐	𜰑	𜰓	𜰔
7x	日	月	火	水	木	金	土	生	年	時	分	秒	円	¥	£	🢳
8x	NBSP	。	「	」	、	・	ヲ	ァ	ィ	ゥ	ェ	ォ	ャ	ュ	ョ	ッ
9x	ー	ア	イ	ウ	エ	オ	カ	キ	ク	ケ	コ	サ	シ	ス	セ	ソ
Ax	タ	チ	ツ	テ	ト	ナ	ニ	ヌ	ネ	ノ	ハ	ヒ	フ	ヘ	ホ	マ
Bx	ミ	ム	メ	モ	ヤ	ユ	ヨ	ラ	リ	ル	レ	ロ	ワ	ン	゛	゜
Cx	NBSP	▐	▄	▔	▁	▏	🮐	▕	█	◤	🮇	├	◘	└	┐	▂
Dx	┌	┴	┬	┤	▎	▌	🮈	🮂	▀	▃	🭿	╭	╮	┘	▞	▚
Ex	🭹	♠	🭲	🭸	🭷	🭶	🭺	🭱	🭴	◣	╰	╯	🭼	╲	╱	🭽
Fx	🭾	•	🭻	♥	🭰	◢	╳	◦	♣	🭵	♦	┼	🮌	🭳	◥	π
Control character Differs from MZ-700/MZ-800 character set

==== Display ====
The MZ-80 series' Japanese display character set is extremely similar to the MZ-700/MZ-800 Japanese primary display character set, differing only at 0x40 and 0x80.

Sharp MZ-80 series (Japanese display)
	0	1	2	3	4	5	6	7	8	9	A	B	C	D	E	F
0x	SP	A	B	C	D	E	F	G	H	I	J	K	L	M	N	O
1x	P	Q	R	S	T	U	V	W	X	Y	Z	┼	└	┘	├	┴
2x	0	1	2	3	4	5	6	7	8	9	-	=		/	.	,
3x	🭶	🭰	🭼	🭿	🭸	🭲	🮂	▎	🭺	🭴	▄	▐	▁	▕	▂	🮇
4x	NBSP	♠	◥	█	♦	←	♣	•	◦	?	◘	╭	╮	◣	◢	
5x	↑	<	[	♥	]	@	◤	>	🮌	\	▒	▚	┌	┐	┤	┬
6x	π	!	"		$	%	&	'	(	)	+		▞	╳	╯	╰
7x	▔	▏	🭽	🭾	🭷	🭱	╱	╲	🭹	🭳	▀	▌	🭻	🭵	▃	🮈
8x	NBSP	チ	コ	ソ	シ	イ	ハ	キ	ク	ニ	マ	ノ	リ	モ	ミ	ラ
9x	セ	タ	ス	ト	カ	ナ	ヒ	テ	サ	ン	ツ	ロ	ケ	「	ァ	ャ
Ax	ワ	ヌ	フ	ア	ウ	エ	オ	ヤ	ユ	ヨ	ホ	ヘ	レ	メ	ル	ネ
Bx	ム	」	ィ	ュ	ヲ	、	ゥ	ョ	゜	・	ェ	ッ	゛	。	ォ	ー
Cx	🢳	🢷 (Note: Character representing one of the cursor control characters (the cursor keys, home, and clear).)	🢵	🢶	🢴	🅷	🅲	🛸︎	𜰁	𜰀	🯅	𜰂	𜰃	𜰄	𜱯	😐︎
Dx	日	月	火	水	木	金	土	生	年	時	分	秒	円	¥	£	🐍︎
Ex	𜰅	𜰆	𜰇	𜰉	𜰋	𜰌	𜰍	𜰏	𜰎	𜰐	𜰑	𜰒	𜰓	𜰔	𜰊	🮐
Fx	NBSP	𜰡	𜰢	𜰣	𜰤	𜰥	𜰦	𜰧	𜰨	𜰩	𜰪	𜰫	𜰬	𜰭	𜰮	𜰯
Differs from MZ-700/MZ-800 character set
