= Mac OS Keyboard encoding =

Represent keyboard symbols

Mac OS Keyboard is an encoding used in Classic Mac OS to represent keyboard symbols.

== Character set ==
Mac OS Keyboard
	0	1	2	3	4	5	6	7	8	9	A	B	C	D	E	F
0x	NUL		⇥	⇤	⌤	⇧	⌃	⌥	BS	␣	⌦	↩	↪	CR		🖉 (Note: The addition of U+1F589 to Unicode postdates the creation of Apple's mapping file, which maps this character to the Private Use Area as U+F802.)
1x	⇣	⌘	✓	◆	^{*}			⌫	⇠	⇡	⇢	⎋	⌧			
2x	SP															
3x	0	1	2	3	4	5	6	7	8	9						
4x							F									
5x																
6x		␣	⇞	⇪	←	→	↖	? ⃝	↑	↘	↓	⇟			❘⃝	F1
7x	F2	F3	F4	F5	F6	F7	F8	F9	F10	F11	F12					
8x								F13	F14	F15	⎈	⎇	⏏			
9x																
Ax																
Bx																
Cx																
Dx																
Ex																
Fx																
Private use characters: ^* The character 0x14 is a solid Apple logo. Apple uses U+F8FF in the Corporate Private Use Area for this logo, but it is usually not supported on non-Apple platforms.
