= Num Lock =

Computer key

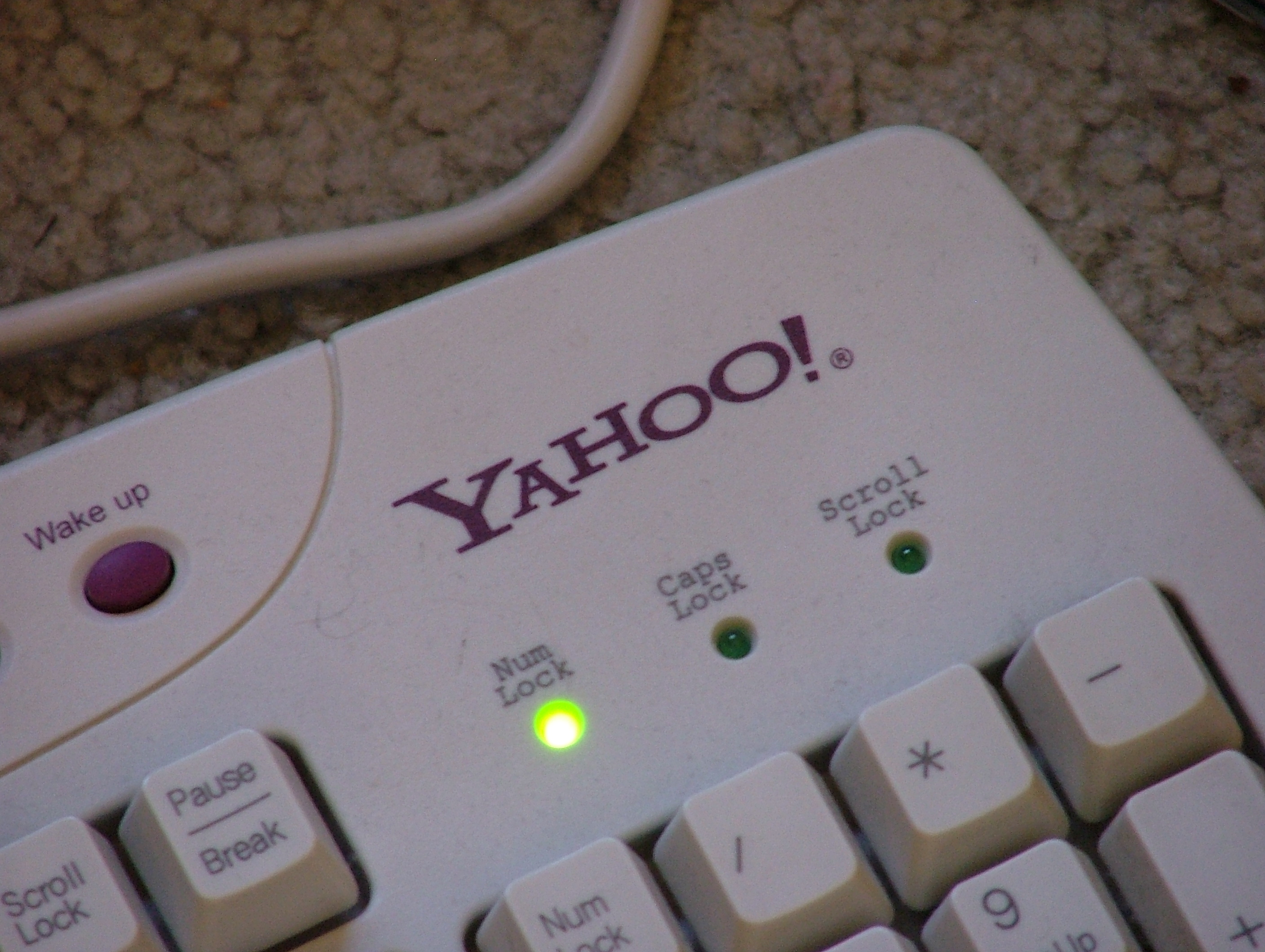
A keyboard with Num Lock turned on as indicated by a LED

Num Lock or Number Lock (⇭) is a key on the numeric keypad of most computer keyboards. It is a lock key, like Caps Lock and Scroll Lock. Its state affects the function of the numeric keypad commonly located to the right of the main keyboard and is commonly displayed by an LED built into the keyboard.

The Num Lock key exists because earlier 84-key IBM PC keyboards did not have cursor control or arrows separate from the numeric keypad. Most earlier computer keyboards had different number keys and cursor control keys; however, to reduce cost, IBM chose to combine the two in their early PC keyboards. Num Lock would be used to select between the two functions. On some laptop computers, the Num Lock key is used to convert part of the main keyboard to act as a (slightly skewed) numeric keypad rather than letters. On some laptop computers, the Num Lock key is absent and replaced by the use of a key combination.

Since Apple keyboards never had a combination of arrow keys and numeric keypad (but some lacked arrow keys, function keys, and a numeric keypad altogether), Apple has keyboards with a separate numeric keypad but no functional Num Lock key. Keyboards manufactured by Apple will instead use a Clear key but not all Apple manufactured keyboards will be provided with it.

Numeric keypad

Keys affected by Num Lock
Key on Numeric Keypad	Num Lock On	Num Lock Off
1	1	End
2	2	Down Arrow
3	3	Page Down
4	4	Left Arrow
5	5	does nothing (usually)
6	6	Right Arrow
7	7	Home
8	8	Up Arrow
9	9	Page Up
0	0 (zero or comma)	Insert
.	. (dot) or , (comma)	Delete

IBM PC keyboard (Windows, ANSI US layout)
Esc

F1
F2
F3
F4

F5
F6
F7
F8

F9
F10
F11
F12

PrtScn/
SysRq
Scroll
Lock
Pause/
Break

Insert
Home
PgUp

Num
Lock
∕
∗
−
Delete
End
PgDn
7
8
9
+

4
5
6

↑

1
2
3
Enter
←
↓
→
0
Ins
.
Del
