= Pado =

PADO may refer to:

- "PPPoE Active Discovery Offer", part of the Point-to-Point Protocol over Ethernet
- Page Down button on computer keyboard
- Peace and Development Organization, an NGO in Pakistan
- Pado, a 2023 EP by South Korean boy band Pentagon
