= Copy Cursor =

Copy Cursor, Copy-Cursor or CopyCursor may refer to:

- Copy Cursor (Acorn), a feature in Acorn MOS since 1981 and RISC OS since 1987
- Copy Cursor (CPC), a feature in the Amstrad CPC series since 1984
- Copy Cursor (K3PLUS), a feature in the extended DOS keyboard driver K3PLUS since 1991
- Copy Cursor (FreeKEYB), a feature in the advanced DOS keyboard and console driver FreeKEYB since 1996
