= Fn key =

Keyboard modifier key

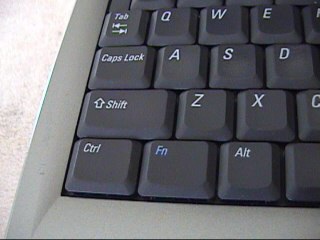
Fn key on a Dell Inspiron 1150 laptop

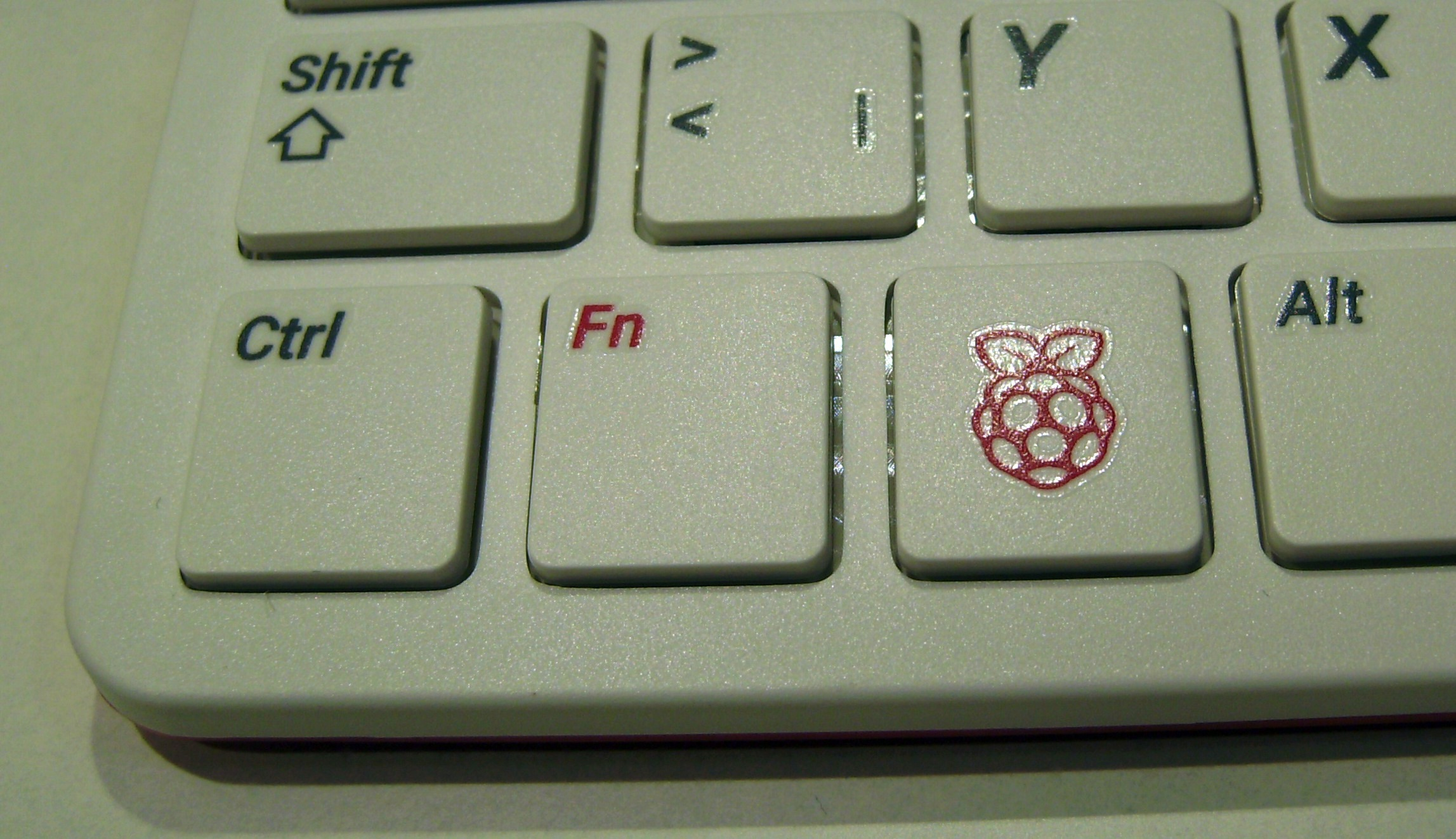
Fn key on a USB Raspberry Pi keyboard

The Fn key, short form for function, is a modifier key on many keyboards. It is generally used for the purpose of rapidly changing display or audio settings, such as brightness, contrast, or volume. When included on laptop keyboards, it is often combined with the Alt key due to restricted keyboard size. It is also found on many full-sized "multimedia" keyboards as the F-Lock key.

== Compact layouts ==
Typically, in a compact layout the main area of the keyboard (containing the letter keys) is kept in much the same layout as with a full-sized keyboard, and the numeric keypad is moved to share a group of central keys. This allows typists to enter text without having to learn a new layout. The symbol that is accessed through pressing Fn is often printed on the key in a smaller font, a box, or different colour (usually blue but sometimes orange).

Apple iBook compact layout (UK)

This 78-key ISO layout is taken from an iBook G4. Characters in blue are accessed through the Fn key, but functions on the top row can be accessed without Fn key in macOS.

Other Fn key placements

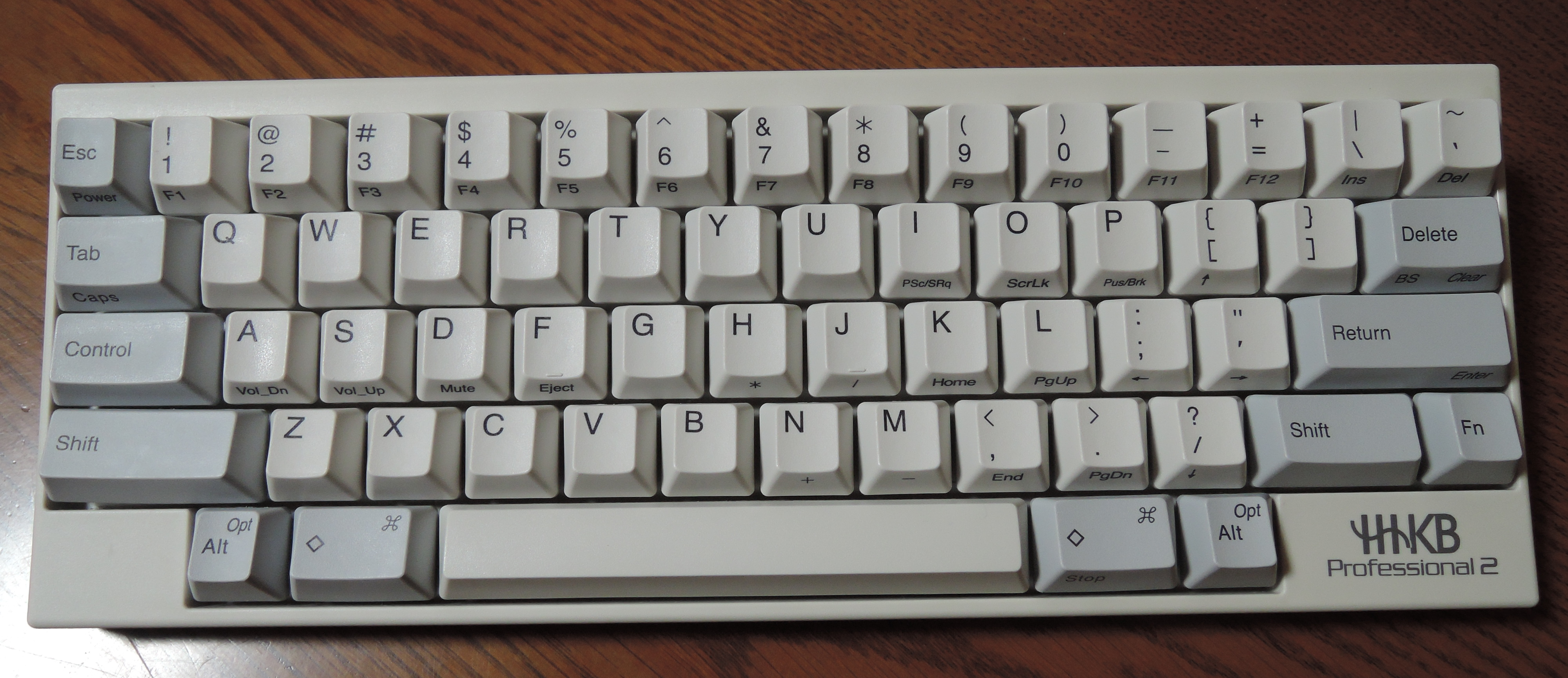
On Happy Hacking Keyboard Fn key is next to right ⇧ Shift key

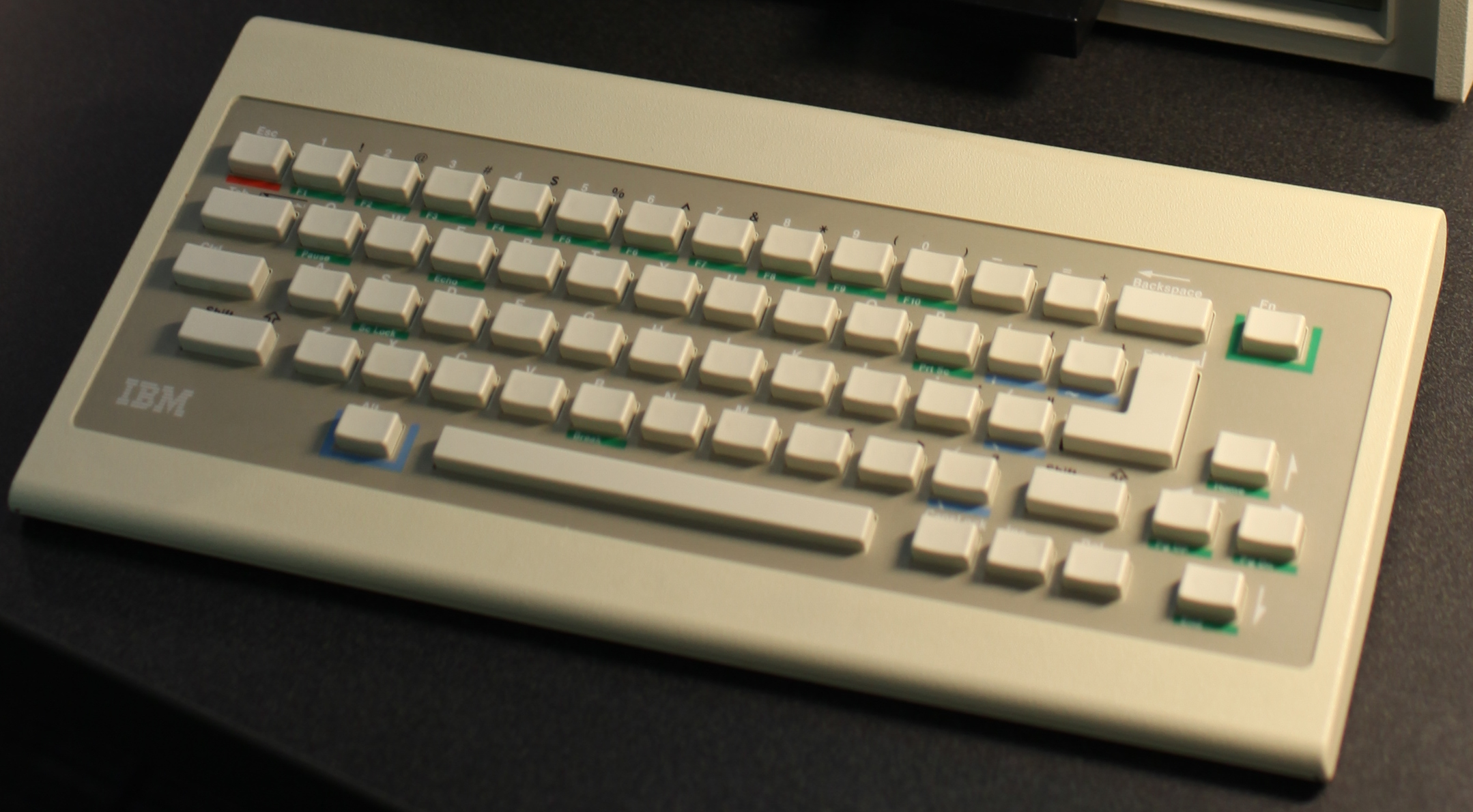
On PCjr's keyboard Fn key was next to ← Backspace key

== Technical details ==
Fn is a modifier key, and works like other modifiers keys, such as Ctrl, Shift, Alt and AltGr. For a standard modifier key, the microcontroller inside the keyboard sends a scancode for the modifier itself, which is then interpreted by the operating system and combined with other simultaneous key-presses. The Fn key is a form of meta-modifier key, in that it causes the operating system to see altered scancodes when other keys on the keyboard are pressed. However, because the operating system has no notion of the Fn key, the key can not normally be remapped in software, unlike all other standard keyboard keys.

While it is more common for the Fn key processing to happen directly in the keyboard micro-controller, offering no knowledge to the main computer of whether the Fn key was pressed, some manufacturers, like Lenovo, perform this mapping in BIOS, allowing remapping the Fn key for the built-in keyboard; and Apple, in which the Fn key is mappable and serves other uses too, as triggering the Dictation function by pressing the Fn key twice, and changing the input source if there are multiple or showing the emoji and symbols menu by pressing the Fn key once.

In addition to being mapped to standard keyboard keys like Scroll Lock and Num Lock, the Fn key combinations may also be mapped to control system interfaces to change the LCD brightness, VGA output, or speaker volume on most laptop computers.

Microsoft Windows added native support for Fn keys since Windows 2000 and Windows Me.

== Fn and Control key placement ==
There is not yet an agreed-upon standard for the placement of the Fn key, although most manufacturers have elected to place it alongside a shrunken and/or displaced left Control key. Because the Control key is most frequently associated with OS and application shortcuts (such as Control+S to save a document, or Control+Shift+Escape to launch the Task Manager in modern versions of Microsoft Windows), altering its size and placement is often regarded as inconvenient for users accustomed to the larger left Control key on IBM PC-style keyboards commonly used for desktop computers.

The majority of portable computer manufacturers today (including HP, Dell, and Samsung) currently place the Fn key between the left Control key and the left Windows key, making it the second key from the left on the bottom row of the keyboard. This usually means that the Control key is reduced in size, but allows it to remain in the lowest-left position on the keyboard.

Conversely, the Fn key is the furthest left on the bottom row of Lenovo ThinkPad laptops with the Control key to its right. This arrangement is currently unique to ThinkPads amongst all laptops shipped with Windows, but it is one that has been in place since the modern ThinkPad product line was introduced by IBM in 1992. IBM designers chose this arrangement at least in part because it allowed the laptop's ThinkLight to be turned on in the dark simply by feeling for the keys in two of the keyboard's corners. Notably, ThinkPads did not include Windows keys on any of their keyboards until 2006, which meant that though the left Control key was displaced by the Fn key, neither it nor the left Alt key needed to be made smaller. The inclusion of Windows keys on ThinkPad models from mid-2006 onwards was achieved mainly by shrinking the left Alt key, which means that ThinkPad keyboards now generally have larger left Control keys than those of many other manufacturers, and are unique in preserving on laptops the Control, Windows, and Alt key arrangement used on most desktop keyboards. Many laptops place the Fn key at a less convenient position (and with a smaller size) within the top row of functions keys F1 to F12 and other "multimedia" or manufacturer-specific device/power control key.

Apple also place the Fn key at the bottom left of the keyboard, displacing and shrinking the left Control key, though this is less controversial as macOS, the main operating system for most Apple laptops, is much less reliant on the Control key for shortcuts and modifiers than Windows or Unix-like operating systems, as the Command key is used more often for shortcuts and modifiers.

This inconsistency between manufacturers, and the overall issue of Control key shrinkage, has long been a point of contention between laptop purchasers and users, which is aggravated by the fact that on most keyboards the Fn key is mapped at the hardware level and so cannot be remapped (that is, reconfigured or virtually "moved") at the OS level. Lenovo, however, have since circa 2011 allowed users to reverse the Fn and left Control key arrangement via a BIOS setting.

Other manufacturers have chosen to map the Fn key not to the left of the space bar but instead to the right, so that the space bar can be better centered with the rest positions (alphabetic keys F and J on Latin layouts), without sacrificing the width of the left Control and left Alt key (already reduced by the insertion of the left Win key between them), while keeping AltGr on the right large enough for more frequent use on international layouts; in that case, the Fn key just replaces the second Win key (which is optional and in fact not needed) of extended PC keyboards. Other manufacturers have placed the Fn key at end of row B, immediately to the right of the second Shift key which is larger than necessary for typing text, in order to map the second Win key next to the right of AltGr, or to preserve the conventional placement of Japanese input mode keys.

A different solution, which side-steps the Fn key placement issue altogether, is to remap the Caps-Lock key as Control. This emulates the layout of the IBM Model F keyboard for the original IBM PC, which placed the Caps-Lock key where right Control is found on modern keyboards, a location that is favoured by some Vim and Emacs users because of its prominent location and long-time use on Unix workstations. There can be up to 24 function keys on a keyboard, labeled F1 through F24.

== Common Fn key features ==
Fn key features vary from keyboard to keyboard, but the common ones are the following:

- Adjust or mute audio output
- Increase/decrease display's brightness or contrast
- Activate an external monitor for giving a presentation
- Activate Stand By mode
- Hibernate
- Sleep/Wake up
- Eject a CD/DVD
- Lock the keyboard
- Toggle keyboard illumination (if any)
- Toggle built-in display (if any; usually without notifying the OS)
- Toggle touchpad (if any)
- Toggle built-in camera (if any)
- Toggle Bluetooth
- Toggle Wi-Fi
- Launching a character map and/or emoji keyboard (prevalent on iOS and MacOS keyboards since the late 2010s; denoted with an additional globe symbol)
- Lock the device
- Screenshot
- Open default web browser, email client, calculator, or media app.
- Pause and fast-forward media.
- Open the OS' search menu.
- Changing the input source
