= Mark and space =

States of a communications signal

Mark and space are terms used in telecommunications to describe two different signal states of a communications signal, generally at the physical layer of a communications system. The terms derive from the early days of the electric telegraph system, where the marking state would cause a mark to be output on paper, and the spacing state would create no mark.

7-bit Asynchronous Data Communication surrounded by start, parity and end elements including one "0" (spacing) start element and one "1" (marking) stop element

Diagram of RS-232 signalling for an uppercase ASCII "K" character (0x4b) with 1 start bit, 8 data bits, 1 stop bit. Mark and Space depict negative and positive voltage levels.

The terms would continue to be used in systems such as RS-232, with similar conventions, that "mark" would be encoded by a negative voltage (or current flow), and "space" by a positive voltage (or no current flow). In such systems, the line is typically left in the "mark" state when idle.

"Mark" is generally identified with the binary digit "1" and "space" with the binary digit "0".

== See also ==
- Baud
- Break key
- Morse code
