= Clear (Unix) =

Computer operating system command

clear
- Clear being used on Linux under uxterm
- Original author: Computer Systems Research Group at the University of California, Berkeley
- Developers: Various open-source and commercial developers
- Release: February 24, 1979; 47 years ago
- Operating system: Unix, Unix-like, V, KolibriOS
- Type: Command

clear is a computer operating system command which is used to bring the command line on top of the computer terminal. It is available in various Unix shells on Unix and Unix-like operating systems as well as on other systems such as KolibriOS.

On Unix clear uses the terminfo or termcap database, as well as looking into the environment for the terminal type in order to deduce how to clear the screen.

ISO standard 9995-7 specifies that the following symbol be used to indicate this function on a keyboard, which is included in Unicode as: ⎚ CLEAR SCREEN SYMBOL.

== History ==
The clear command appeared in 2.79BSD on February 24, 1979. Later, in 1985, the command was also included in Unix 8th edition. MSDOS and similar systems use cls as an equivalent command.

== See also ==
- List of Unix commands
