= F-Lock =

Computer key

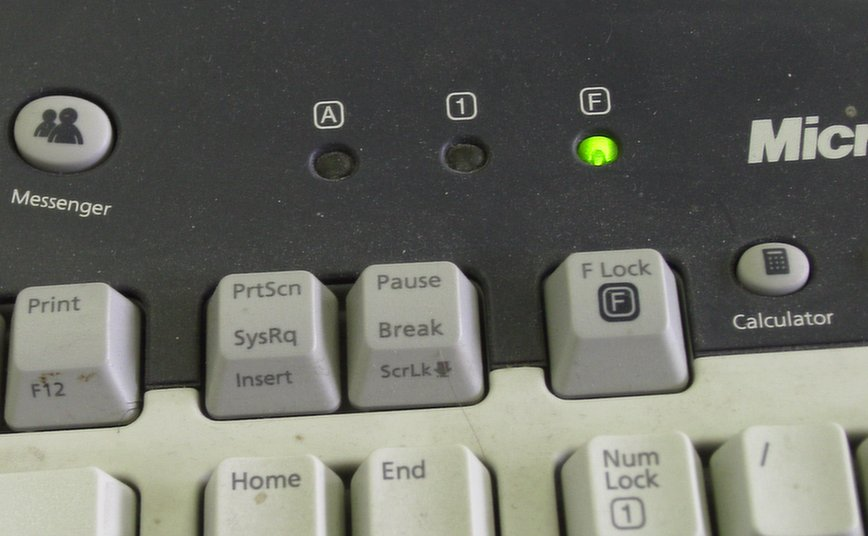
The F-Lock key on a Microsoft keyboard

The F-Lock key, introduced by Microsoft in 2001, toggles the state of the function keys. When on, keys F1 to F12 behave as applicable, with meanings defined by the application being used at the time. When off, new behaviour is used: F5 means "open", F10 means "spell" etc. In early models, the state reverted to off at each reboot or keyboard reset, but later models retained F-Lock state across reboots.

Other keyboard manufacturers (such as Logitech and Viewsonic) have also implemented the F-Lock onto their keyboards.

== Issues ==
The introduction of F-Lock was marked by criticism on several points. First, the behaviour was unintuitive: pressing a key such as F4 by default no longer had its normal meaning, so combinations such as Alt+F4 appeared not to work.

Secondly, the choice of secondary function assigned to each key appeared to be arbitrary: whereas F7 was the traditional key for spell-check (used notably by Microsoft itself in its Office products), F7 was assigned the function of "reply", and spell-check was assigned to F10. This caused strong criticism from some commentators.

Pressing F2 in Windows Explorer in attempt to rename a file would instead undo an earlier file operation, with potentially disastrous consequences if the actual effect went silently unnoticed.

Because of such concerns, a number of methods for disabling the F-Lock function appeared on the web.

Many Windows/PC users have found a workaround using Microsoft's Intellitype Pro software, which allows a user to assign keystrokes/macros to the function and accessory keys. For example, assigning a macro {Press F1} to the function key F1 renders the F-lock issue moot, since the OS will interpret the key press as F1 regardless of the F-lock state.

== Functions ==
The new behaviours assigned to the keys are as follows:

Key	New behaviour
F2	Undo
F3	Redo
F4	New
F5	Open
F6	Close
F7	Reply
F8	Forward
F9	Send
F10	Spell
F11	Save
F12	Print
