= IntelliType =

- 33x31
- A screenshot of the IntelliType software running in Windows 7
- Developer: Microsoft
- Final release: 8.20.469.0 (Windows), 8.2.0 (Mac OS X) / August 16, 2011
- Operating system: Mac OS X, Microsoft Windows
- Type: Device driver
- License: Proprietary
- Website: www.microsoft.com

Microsoft IntelliType is the former brand driver software for Microsoft's series of computer keyboards. Microsoft released versions for both Windows and Mac OS X. It has been succeeded by Microsoft Mouse and Keyboard Center, which combines IntelliType with IntelliPoint.

IntelliType supports all known Microsoft keyboards (including those that are shipped as parts of desktop sets, as well as entertainment keyboards – i.e. those that are intended for Media center). However, advanced features may only be available on certain models (the users select their keyboard's type inside the program to access that keyboard type's specific button selection). As of version 10.15 Microsoft IntelliType no longer installs on Mac OS X.

== Supported keyboards ==
Note: Version 8.0 and above dropped PS/2 support for the following list. As even adapters can't assist, Microsoft keeps version 7.1 as an offered download for users who still own keyboards with PS/2 connectors (instead of USB).

IntelliType's help file

Supported keyboards
Keyboard	Windows	Mac OS X (prior to 10.15)
Internet Keyboard	Yes	Yes
Internet Pro Keyboard	Yes	?
Keyboard Elite for Bluetooth	Yes	Yes
Wireless Comfort Keyboard 4000	Yes	Yes
Comfort Curve 2000	Yes	Yes
Comfort Curve 3000	No	No
Digital Keyboard 3000	Yes	Yes
Digital Media Keyboard	Yes	?
Wireless Laser Keyboard 3000	Yes	Yes
Wireless Laser Keyboard 5000	Yes	Yes
Wireless Laser Keyboard 6000	Yes	Yes
Wireless Laser Keyboard 7000	Yes	Yes
Wireless Entertainment Keyboard 7000	Yes	Yes
Wireless Entertainment Keyboard 8000	Yes	Yes
Natural Ergonomic Keyboard 4000	Yes	Yes
Natural Wireless Ergonomic Keyboard 7000	Yes	Yes
Digital Media Keyboard 3000	Yes	Yes
Natural Keyboard Pro	Yes	Yes
Wireless MultiMedia Keyboard	Yes	Yes
Wireless Keyboard 2000 v2.0	Yes	?
SideWinder X6	Yes	No
SideWinder X4	Yes	Comes with CD
Logitech k120	Yes	?

== Special features ==
If the keyboard has multimedia buttons, the user can define them to run any program or action.

On-screen indication of NumLock/CapsLock toggling with some keyboards.

On-screen indication of volume level when level is changed.

== Limitations ==
While the user could always define special keys (and multimedia keys, if such exist), it was only possible since version 6.3 to define them not just globally but also per application.

Version 6.2 forced the user to constantly check for updates by installing and launching the file "dpupdchk.exe" in the background. It must stay in the background for the control panel's settings to launch (although it could be avoided by renaming the file to something else). Version 6.3 fixed this behavior by only making it an opt-in option during the installation.

Version 7.0 and later in Windows 7 64-bit has recently been proven to disable the media keys (Play/Pause, Next, Previous, Stop) for third-party media players such as iTunes and Media Jukebox when they are not the primary window of focus. Some workaround exists: This behavior continues to be an issue as of Version 8.

== See also ==
- IntelliPoint — Microsoft mouse driver.
