= End key =

Key on many computer keyboards

The End key among other keys

The End key is a key commonly found on desktop and laptop keyboards. The key has the opposite effect of the Home key. In some limited-size keyboards where the End key is missing the same functionality can be reached via the key combination of Fn+→ or Control + End keys.

Its standard symbol ⇲ as described in ISO/IEC 9995-7, i.e. U+21F2 ⇲ SOUTH EAST ARROW TO CORNER, is used on some full-size keyboards instead of a possibly localized text label.

== Microsoft Windows ==
In modern Microsoft Windows text editing applications, the End key is primarily used to move the cursor to the end of the line in which it is positioned. When the text is not editable, it is used to scroll to the end of the document; this can also be done in editable text if the key is pressed along with Control.

The End key can also be used to highlight all the characters after the cursor in a certain line if pressed along with ⇧ Shift in editable text.

== macOS ==
In most macOS applications, the key works differently than on other platforms. When the key is pressed, the window scrolls to the bottom, while the cursor position does not change at all; that is, the End key is tied to the window, not the text box being edited. On Apple keyboards that do not have an End key, one can press ⌥ Option+→ for the End key functionality described above. To get the same result as the Windows platform (that is, going to the end of the current line of text), press ⌘ Command+→. In most single-line text fields, you can also instead press the down arrow key. An application can be used to change this behaviour.

== Linux ==
In Linux, the End key has basically the same functionality as it does on Windows. It positions the cursor at the end of a line in editable text, and otherwise scrolls a scrollable document to the end. Also, like Windows, the End key can be used to highlight all the characters after the cursor in a certain line if pressed along with ⇧ Shift in editable text.

== Non-GUI applications ==
In older screen-oriented, text-based (non-GUI) applications, the user pressed the "End" key to indicate that they had finished entering data on a particular "screen".

== See also ==
- Home key
