= Home key =

Key on many computer keyboards

The Home key among other keys.

The Home key is commonly found on desktop and laptop keyboards. The key has the opposite effect of the End key. In limited-size keyboards where the Home key is missing the same functionality can be reached via the key combination of Fn+←.

Its standard symbol ⇱ from ISO/IEC 9995-7, i.e. U+21F1 ⇱ NORTH WEST ARROW TO CORNER, is used on some full-size keyboards instead of a possibly localized text label.

== Microsoft Windows ==
In modern Microsoft Windows text editing applications, it is primarily used to return the cursor to the beginning of the line where the cursor is located. When the text is not editable, the Home key is used to return to the beginning of the document; this can also be done in editable text if the key is pressed along with Control.

The Home key can also be used to select all the characters before the cursor in a certain line if pressed along with ⇧ Shift in selectable text.

== macOS ==
Only full-sized Apple keyboards have a Home key. In macOS single line text fields, the key works like it does in MS-DOS and Windows, going back to the days of dumb terminals, where Home moves to the start of the line. In multiline word processors, when the key is pressed, the window scrolls to the top, while the caret position does not change at all; that is, the Home key is tied to the current window, not the text box being edited. On Apple keyboards that do not have a Home key, one can press Fn+← for the Home key functionality described above. To get the same result as the Windows platform (that is, moving the insertion point to the beginning of the current line of text), one can press ⌘ Command+←. An application can also be used to change this behavior.

== Linux ==
In Linux, the Home key has basically the same functionality as it does on Windows. It returns the cursor to the beginning of the line in editable text, and otherwise scrolls a scrollable document to the beginning. Also, like Windows, the Home key can be used to select all the characters before the cursor in a certain line if pressed along with ⇧ Shift in editable text.

== Non-GUI applications ==
A Home key was present on the ADM-3A and many other pre-PC dumb terminal keyboards. Its application here was to return the text cursor to the beginning of the screen line.
