= Insert key =

Key on many computer keyboards

The insert key among other keys

The Insert key Insert (often abbreviated Ins) is a key commonly found on computer keyboards.

It is primarily used to switch between the two text-entering modes on a personal computer (PC) or word processor:

- overtype mode, in which the cursor, when typing, overwrites any text that is present in the current location; and
- insert mode, where the cursor inserts a character at its current position, forcing all characters past it one position further.

The insert/overtype mode toggling is not global for the computer or even for a single application but rather local to the text input window in which the Insert key was pressed.

== Overview ==
On early text-based computing environments and terminals, when the cursor is in overtype mode, it was represented as a block that surrounded the entire letter to be overstruck; when in insert mode, the cursor consisted of the vertical bar that is highly common among modern applications, or a blinking underline under the position where a new character would be inserted.

On modern keyboards, the Insert key is only present on the control block between the typewriter keys and the numeric keypad. Originally an insert key was provided in the typewriter key block beside a delete key; both have been removed in favor of a double-sized 'backspace key'. The key was often maligned as unnecessary and more likely to be accidentally than intentionally activated.

When keymapping using Octal code, the desired key may be set by sending \e\161 to perform the "insert" function.

== History ==
Circa 1972, IBM Model B keyboards were equipped with an "INS MODE" key above the cursor arrow keys, next to "DEL". The Model B keyboards were used with 3270-series terminals that processed screen data locally before sending to the host.

HP 2640 series terminals, introduced in 1974, possessed an "Insert Char" mode-toggle button with a status light. It was positioned above the numeric keypad group, along with Delete Char, Insert Line, and Delete Line non-modal buttons.

The IBM 5100 portable (1975) showed Insert and Delete above the top-row cursor keys. The IBM 5150 PC (1981) featured Ins and Del on the 0 and . keys of its Model F keyboard.

Commodore included an INST|DEL key on its PET and C64 micro-computers from 1977 onwards.

Digital Equipment Corporation's VT220 terminal (1985) introduced an "INSERT HERE" key in the editing key group. It would send the escape sequence "CSI 2 ~" to the host. In return, a host application could send "CSI 4 h" or "CSI 4 l" to switch Insert/Replace Mode (IRM) on the terminal.

XTerm, a terminal emulator for the X Window System, sends "CSI 2 ~" in DEC mode, "CSI 2 z" in Sun mode, "ESC Q" in HP mode, and "CSI L" in SCO mode.

== Use in applications ==
Modern word processing applications operate in insert mode by default, but can still be switched to overtype mode by pressing the Insert key. Some applications indicate overtype mode with a letter-width cursor box, as opposed to the standard narrow cursor; however, others use the narrow cursor for both modes, and indicate overtype with an "OVR" indicator in the status bar.

The Insert key, when pressed along with Control or Shift keys, can also be used to copy or paste in Microsoft Windows. This behavior comes from the Common User Access standard.

Screen readers use the insert key for hotkeys for reading text, speaking formatting information, or opening the screen reader's configuration menu or window.

== Symbol ==
"Insert" or "Ins" are commonly written on keyboards. U+2380 ⎀ INSERTION SYMBOL is the ISO 9995-7 character for the Insert key.
