= Delete key =

Key on many computer keyboards

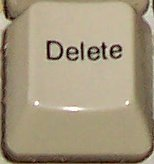
Delete key on PC keyboard

The delete key (often abbreviated del) is a button on most computer keyboards which is typically used to delete either (in text mode) the character ahead of or beneath the cursor, or (in GUI mode) the currently-selected object. The key is sometimes referred to as the "forward delete" key. This is because the backspace key also deletes characters, but to the left of the cursor. On many keyboards, such as most Apple keyboards, the key with the backspace function is also labelled "delete".

== Position and labeling on keyboards ==
The key appears on English-language IBM-compatible PC keyboards labeled as Delete or Del, sometimes accompanied by a crossed-out right-arrow symbol. However, sometimes the key labelled Delete performs the Backspace function instead, for example on some Apple keyboards. A dedicated symbol for "delete" exists as U+2326 ⌦ ERASE TO THE RIGHT but its use as a keyboard label is not universal.

The Delete key is typically smaller and less-conveniently located than the Backspace key, and on keyboards where space is limited, for example those omitting the numeric keypad or virtual keyboards on mobile devices, it is often omitted altogether.

== Uses ==
When struck on a computer keyboard during text or command editing, the delete key (Delete or Del), known less ambiguously as forward delete, discards the character ahead of the cursor's position, moving all following characters one position "back" towards the freed letterspace. The key is also used by many GUI applications to request deletion of the currently-selected object, for example a file in a file browser or a block of text in a word processor.

The delete key often works as a generic command to remove a selected object, such as an image embedded in a document. On Apple Keyboards, both the forward delete key and the delete (backspace) key have the same effect when pressed while an object is selected.

On Unix-like systems, the delete key is usually mapped to ESC[3~ which is the VT220 escape code for the "delete character" key.

The delete key, on many modern motherboards, also functions to open the BIOS setup screen when pressed after starting the computer.

In GUI applications where the Delete key is enabled, especially in file browsers, pressing it does not necessarily immediately delete the selected object, but often a confirmation dialog box will appear to allow the user to cancel the deletion, or the object may instead be silently moved to a "trash folder" or equivalent, so that it can be recovered later. In other GUI contexts, the Undo function can often reverse a deletion.

== See also ==
- Control-Alt-Delete
- Backspace
