= Bucky bit =

Supplementary bit in keyboard encoding

In computing, a bucky bit is a bit in a binary representation of a character that is set by pressing a keyboard modifier key other than the shift key.

== Overview ==
Setting a bucky bit changes the output character. A bucky bit allows the user to type a wider variety of characters and commands while maintaining a reasonable number of keys on a keyboard.

Some of the keys corresponding to bucky bits on modern keyboards are the alt key, control key, meta key, command key (⌘), super key, and option key.

In ASCII, the bucky bit is usually the 8th bit (also known as meta bit). However, in older character representations wider than 8 bits, more high bits could be used as bucky bits. In the modern X Window System, bucky bits are bits 18–23 of an event code.

== History ==
The term was invented at Stanford and is based on Niklaus Wirth's nickname "Bucky". Niklaus Wirth was first to suggest an EDIT key to set the eighth bit of a 7-bit ASCII character sometime in 1964 or 1965.

Bucky bits were used heavily on keyboards designed by Tom Knight at MIT, including space-cadet keyboards used on LISP machines. These could contain as many as seven modifier keys: SHIFT, CTRL, META, HYPER, SUPER, TOP, and GREEK (also referred to as FRONT).

== See also ==
- Knight keyboard
