= Listary =

File search utility for Windows

- Developer: Bopsoft
- Initial release: March 17, 2010
- Stable release: 6.3.5.94 / August 19, 2025; 2 months ago
- Operating system: Windows XP SP3 and later
- Platform: IA-32, x64
- Available in: 28 languages
- List of languages Arabic, Azerbaijani, Brazilian Portuguese, Chinese Simplified, Chinese Traditional, Danish, Dutch, English, Filipino, French, German, Greek, Indonesian, Italian, Japanese, Korean, Malay, Polish, Portuguese, Russian, Serbian, Slovak, Slovenian, Spanish, Spanish (Latin America), Swedish, Turkish, Ukrainian
- Type: Desktop search
- License: Freemium
- Website: www.listary.com

Listary is a desktop search utility for Microsoft Windows that can search for files on a computer. It works with items in File Explorer, Task Manager, Registry Editor, Windows Desktop, and "Open..." or "Save..." dialog boxes. Listary is licensed free of charge for personal use.

== Features ==
- Smart Search: "Find-as-you-type" search list that narrows down on typing a part of the item name.
- Wildcards: Find-as-you-type search using wildcards like '*' and '?'.
- Shortcut to command mode: type /cmd to enter the command line window in the current directory.
- Hotkey: Press Super+W to start Listary. Customize shortcuts to select items from lists.
- The tool sits in the system tray, showing only a search bar that disappears upon pressing the Esc key.
- 'Traditional' search: Find-as-you-type search list that narrows down on typing item names in exact order.
- Text editing with the preferred text editor.
- Auto-complete by pressing the Tab key.
- Regular expression support.

== Reception ==
- Supercharge Windows File Management with Listary Appstorm's Review
- Reviewing Listary, an Awesome File Browsing and Searching tool For Windows GuidingTech's Review
- Listary CNET Editors' review
- Listary - Smart solution for browsing and finding files or folders FindMySoft Editor's Review
- Finding files in Windows folders: Listary
- A Great Improvement On The Windows File Dialog
- How To: Improve File Searching in Windows Explorer using Listary
- GIGA SOFTWARE Review

== See also ==
- Journaling file system
- USN Journal
