= Language input keys =

Type of computer keys

Language input keys, which are usually found on Japanese and Korean keyboards, are keys designed to translate letters using an input method editor (IME). On non-Japanese or Korean keyboard layouts using an IME, these functions can usually be reproduced via hotkeys, though not always directly corresponding to the behavior of these keys.

== Keys for Japanese keyboards ==
Japanese (OADG 109A) keyboard layout with Hiragana keys.

Japanese Apple keyboard

The OADG 109A and older 109 keyboard layouts which are the standard for Microsoft Windows have five dedicated language input keys:

- halfwidth/fullwidth (hankaku/zenkaku 半角/全角) at the top left key of the keyboard;
- alphanumeric (eisū 英数), combined with non-language specific key ⇪ Caps Lock;
- non-conversion (muhenkan 無変換), on the left of the space bar;
- conversion (henkan 変換), on the right of the space bar;
- hiragana (ひらがな), on the right of the space bar, next to 変換.

Apple keyboards designed for Mac OS X have two language input keys: alphanumeric (英数) and kana (かな).

The keyboards for NEC PC-9800 series, which was dominant in Japan during the 1980s and early 1990s, have three language input keys: kana (カナ), NFER (no transfer, same as non-conversion), XFER (transfer, same as conversion).

For non-Japanese keyboards, the following shortcuts can be used for typing Japanese on English keyboard with Windows:

- Alt+⇧ Shift switch between languages (IMEs)
- Ctrl+⇪ Caps Lock switch to Hiragana
- Alt+⇪ Caps Lock if in alphanumeric mode change to Hiragana, then switch to Katakana
- ⇧ Shift+⇪ Caps Lock switch between full-width Hiragana ↔ full-width alphanumeric (romaji)
- Alt+` (Grave Accent) switch between kana ↔ half-width alphanumeric (romaji)
- Alt+~ (Tilde) toggle kana/direct input
- ↵ Enter no conversion, all previous characters are accepted "as is" (all propositions from IME are rejected)
- Space convert current word (last characters) to the first word in the list of proposals
- 2 3 4 5 6 convert to the 2nd-6th word in the list
- F6 convert selected word/characters to full-width hiragana (standard hiragana): ホワイト → ほわいと
- F7 convert to full-width katakana (standard katakana): ほわいと → ホワイト
- F8 convert to half-width katakana (katakana for specific purpose): ホワイト → ﾎﾜｲﾄ
- F9 convert to full-width romaji, all-capitals, proper noun capitalization (Latin script inside Japanese text): ホワイト → ｈｏｗａｉｔｏ → ＨＯＷＡＩＴＯ → Ｈｏｗａｉｔｏ
- F10 convert to half-width romaji, all-capitals, proper noun capitalization (Latin script like standard English): ホワイト → howaito → HOWAITO → Howaito

=== Half-width/Full-width ===
Half-width/Full-width (半角/全角, hankaku / zenkaku) toggles between entering half-width or full-width characters (if 2 versions of same character exists) when IME is on and in Katakana mode or Alphanumeric mode. After MS-IME 98, and also change between IME on and off like Kanji Key.

半角/
全角

漢字

=== Kanji ===
Used to switch between entering mainly Japanese (IME on) and English text (IME off). It is not found as a separate key in the modern Japanese 106/109-key keyboard layout. On the Common Building Block (CBB) Keyboard for Notebooks, as many 106/109-key keyboards, the Kanji key is located on the Alt+半角/全角. It is found as a separate key on the IBM PS/55 5576-001 keyboard. On the IBM PS/55 5576-002 keyboard, it is mapped to the left Alt key.

=== Alphanumeric ===
Alphanumeric (英数, eisū) toggles alphanumeric characters. In the Japanese 106/109-key layout, it is located on the Caps Lock key. Pressing Alphanumeric/Caps Lock key alone actually means alphanumeric function, a user has to press ⇧ Shift+英数 / Caps Lock key to get the caps lock function.

=== Conversion ===
Conversion (変換, henkan) is used to convert kana to kanji. In the Microsoft IME, Conversion selects conversion candidates on highlighted input, and ⇧ Shift+変換 is used to display the previous candidate, or zenkōho (前候補). The alt version of this key is also pronounced zenkōho (全候補), which means "all candidates", shows all input candidates.

前候補
変換 (次候補)

全候補

=== Non-conversion ===
Non-conversion (無変換, muhenkan) specifies that the kana characters entered are not to be converted into kanji candidates.

=== Katakana/Hiragana/Rōmaji ===
Katakana,hiragana,rōmaji (ひらがな / カタカナ / ローマ字, katakana,hiragana,rōmaji) used to switch between hiragana or katakana characters. It can also be found for switching between hiragana, katakana and rōmaji as shown below. Alt+ひらがな / カタカナ / ローマ字 or Ctrl+⇧ Shift+ひらがな / カタカナ / ローマ字 (this feature is printed as Rōmaji (ローマ字) on the same key) toggles between rōmaji input and direct kana input in some IMEs (e.g. Microsoft IME).

カタカナ
ひらがな

ローマ字

== Keys for Korean keyboards ==
Dubeolsik (두벌식) layout, the national standard layout of South Korea

The standard keyboard layout for IBM PC compatibles of South Korea is almost identical to the U.S. layout, with some exceptions:

- Hangul characters are printed on the keys.
- On the top of the \ key, the backslash is replaced with the ₩ (Won sign) or both of them are printed. The backslash has the shape of the Won sign including system fonts such Gulim (굴림) and Malgun Gothic (맑은 고딕). Note that vertical bar | (⇧ Shift+\) is also replaced as the broken bar ¦ on some South Korean keyboards, but the broken bar in Unicode (U+00A6) is not inputted by most of Korean IMEs.
- Keyboards with a small ← Backspace key and large "backwards-L" shaped ↵ Enter key are commonly used in South Korea.
- There are two additional keys: 한/영 Han/Yeong (or 한영 HanYeong) and 한자 Hanja (or 漢字 Hanja) keys. They do not exist as independent keys on some keyboards.

=== Han/Yeong (한/영) ===
It toggles between entering Korean (Hangul) and English (ISO basic Latin alphabet).

Many computer systems support alternative keys or key sequences for keyboards without the Han/Yeong key. It is absent from the keyboards of most portable computers in South Korea, where the right Alt key is used instead. On the right Alt key of these devices, only "한/영" (Han/Yeong) or both "한/영" (Han/Yeong) and Alt are printed.

=== Hanja (한자) ===
It converts Hangul to Chinese characters (hanja) or some special characters.

Many computer systems support alternative keys or key sequences for keyboards without the Hanja key. It is absent from the keyboards of most portable computers in South Korea, where the right Ctrl key is used instead. On the right Ctrl key of these devices, only "한자" (Hanja) or both "한자" (Hanja) and Ctrl are printed.
