= Super key =

Super key may refer to:

- Super key (keyboard button), modifier key on keyboards
- Superkey, database relation
