= Space-cadet keyboard =

Keyboard used on MIT Lisp machines, influential to Emacs

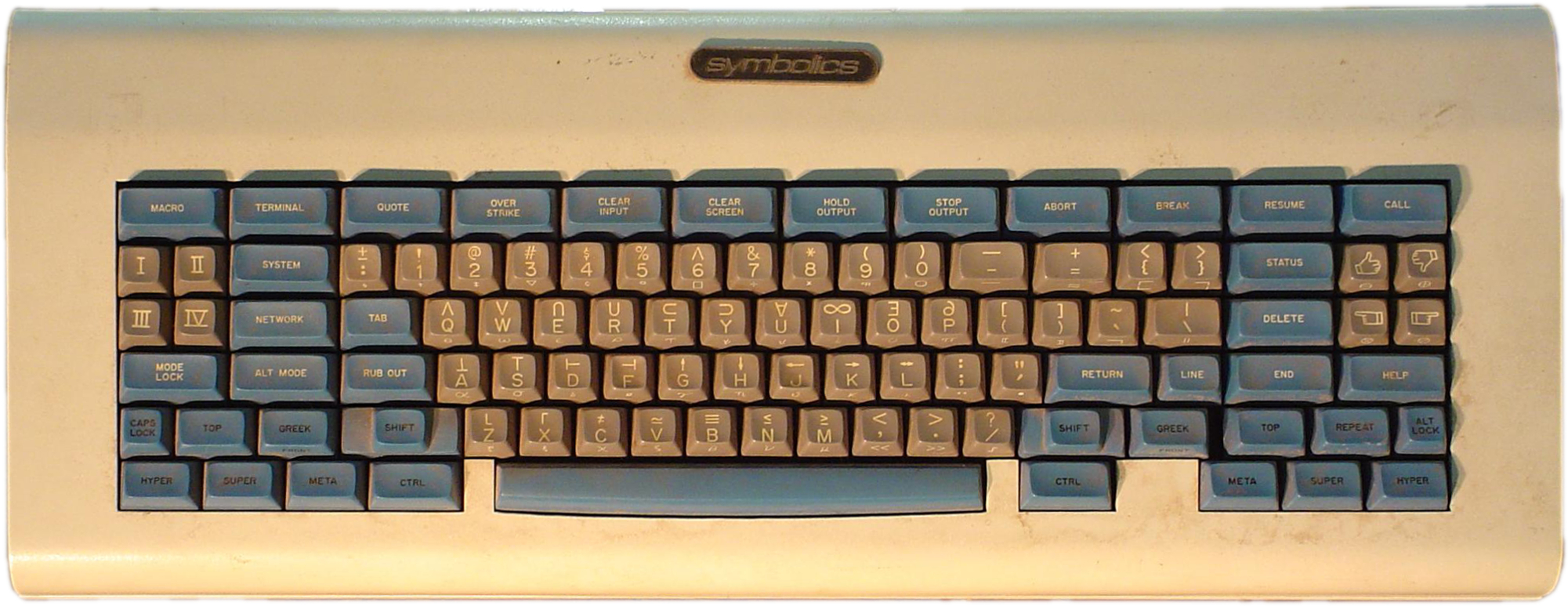
The Symbolics-labeled version shown here was only used with the LM-2, which was Symbolics' repackaged version of the MIT CADR. Later Symbolics systems used a greatly simplified keyboard, the Symbolics keyboard, that retained only the basic layout and the more commonly used function and modifier keys from the space-cadet keyboard.

The space-cadet keyboard is a keyboard designed by John L. Kulp in 1978 and used on Lisp machines at Massachusetts Institute of Technology (MIT). It inspired several still-current jargon terms in the field of computer science and influenced the design of Emacs. It was inspired by the Knight keyboard, which was developed for the Knight TV system, used with MIT's Incompatible Timesharing System.

== Description ==
The space-cadet keyboard is equipped with seven modifier keys: four keys for bucky bits (⎈ Control, ◆ Meta, ❖ Super, and ✦ Hyper), and three shift keys, called ⇧ Shift, Top, and Front (which is labeled on the front of the key; the top of the keycap is labeled Greek). Meta had been introduced on the earlier Knight keyboard, while Hyper and Super were introduced by this keyboard. Each group is in a row, thus allowing easy chording, or pressing of several modifier keys; for example, Control+Meta+Hyper+Super can be pressed with the fingers of one hand, while the other hand presses another key.

Many keys have three symbols on them, accessible by means of the shift keys: a letter and a symbol on the top, and a Greek letter on the front. For example, the G key has a "G" and an up-arrow ("↑") on the top, and the Greek letter gamma ("γ") on the front. By pressing this key with one hand while playing an appropriate "chord" with the other hand on the shift keys, the user can get the following results:

Key pressed	Result
G	g (lowercase G)
⇧ Shift+G	G (uppercase G)
Front+G	γ (lowercase gamma)
Front+⇧ Shift+G	Γ (uppercase gamma)
Top+G	↑ (upwards arrow)

Each of these might, in addition, be typed with any combination of the ⎈ Control, ◆ Meta, ❖ Super, and ✦ Hyper keys. By combining the modifier keys, it is possible to make (50 keys × 5 shift types) × 2^{4} bucky keys = 4000 different inputs. This allows the user to type very complicated mathematical text, and also to have thousands of single-character commands at their disposal. Many users were willing to memorise the command meanings of so many characters if it reduced typing time. This attitude shaped the interface of Emacs. (Note: The way the space-cadet keyboard influenced the design and usage conventions of the Emacs text editor compares with the influence the ADM-3A terminal's keyboard—notably its ⎋ Esc key feature—had upon the competing vi text editor. In both cases, these were the keyboards used by each editor's respective original developers.) Other users, however, thought that so many keys were excessive and objected to this design on the grounds that such a keyboard can be difficult to operate.

Emacs uses "M-" as the prefix for ⎇ Alt when describing key presses: the "M-" stands for Meta on the space-cadet keyboard, and when Emacs was ported to PCs, the Alt key was used in place of Meta.

This keyboard includes a Macro key which has limited application support. It also includes four roman numeral keys (I, II, III, and IV) which allow for easy interaction with lists of four or fewer choices.

The Symbolics Space Cadet Keyboard was used only in the LM-2, a Symbolics repackaged version of the MIT CADR LISP machine at MIT. Later Symbolics systems used a significantly simplified Symbolics Keyboard, but retained the basic layout and modifier keys of the Space Cadet Keyboard.

Space cadet refers to a "trainee astronaut", and also to a keyboard with many keys, like the numerous control devices in a spacecraft cockpit.

== See also ==
- Lisp machine
- Symbolics
- Knight keyboard
