= Meta key =

Modifier key on workstation keyboards of the 1970s/80s

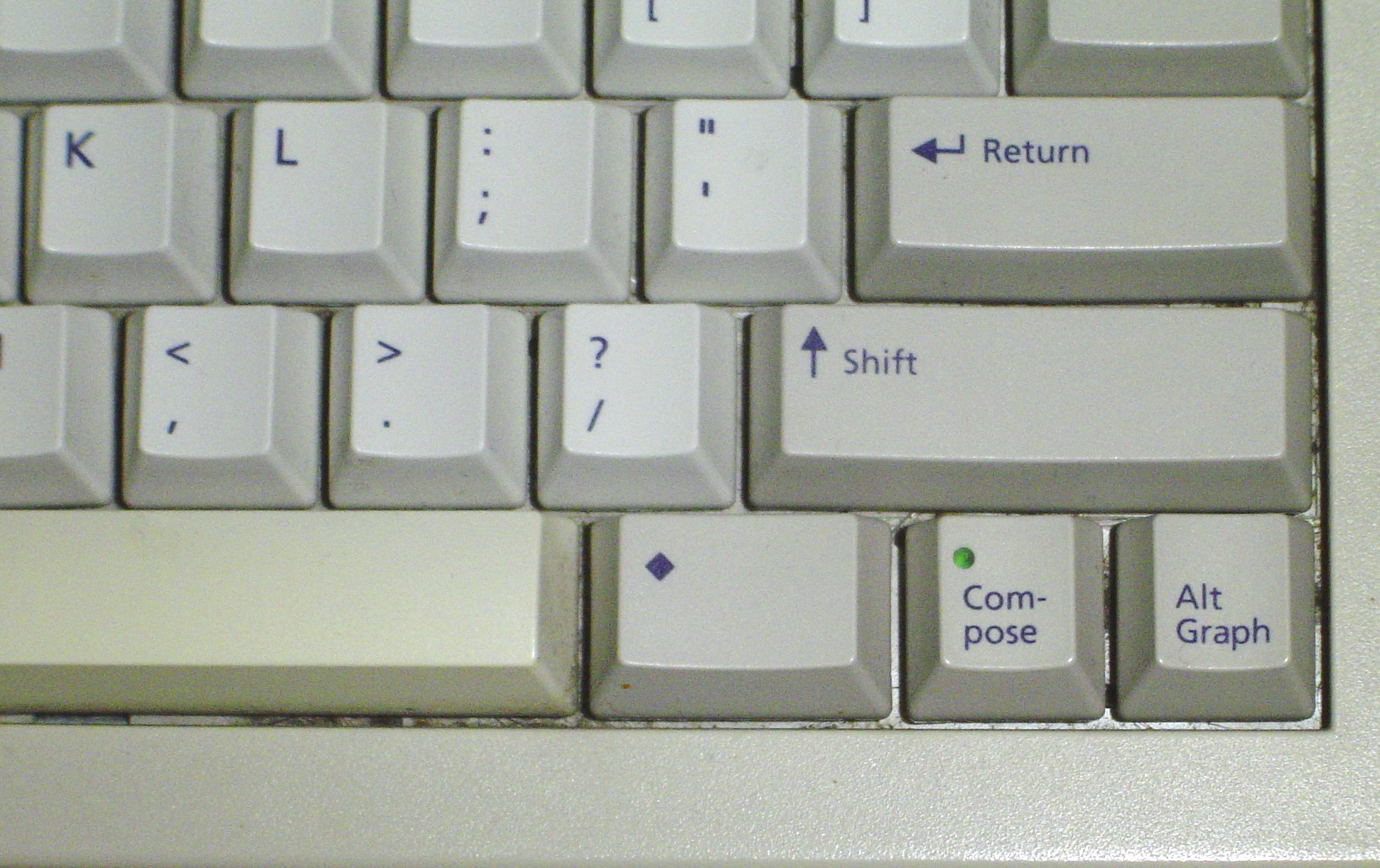
Sun keyboard with Meta key (between space bar and Compose key)

The Meta key is a modifier key on certain keyboards. It first appeared on the Stanford Artificial Intelligence Lab (SAIL)'s SAIL keyboard in 1970.

== History ==
The Meta modifier key first appeared on the Stanford Artificial Intelligence Lab (SAIL) keyboard in 1970 and successors such as the Knight keyboard, space-cadet keyboard, MIT Lisp machine, Symbolics keyboards, and on Sun Microsystems keyboards (where it is marked with a black diamond "◆").

The keyboard used with the LINC computer had a meta key in 1962, but it was not a modifier.

== Use ==
The Meta key generally worked similar to Macintosh's Command key, in that when held down, it modified letters and symbols into immediate commands (shortcuts). On these keyboards, the Control key was placed closest to the space bar, then the Meta key outside Control. The space-cadet keyboard added the Super key outside Meta, and the Hyper key outside that. All these keys produced shortcuts (2^{4}-1 of them for every letter), but the Control ones were easiest to type and most popular, and the Meta ones second-easiest and thus second most popular. However, on most modern keyboards, the Control key is furthest from the space bar, reversing the convenience of shortcuts.

On keyboards that lack a physical Meta key, its functionality may be invoked by other keys such as the Windows key or Macintosh's Option key. However, software often provides another workaround, such as using the Alt key (which does not exist on the Knight keyboard), or using the Esc key as a prefix (e.g., in Emacs). Due to these workarounds, the need for Meta – despite being the most-used additional modifier key – was less than for other modifier keys. It is more common today to use the Windows key to emulate the Super key.

== Gallery ==
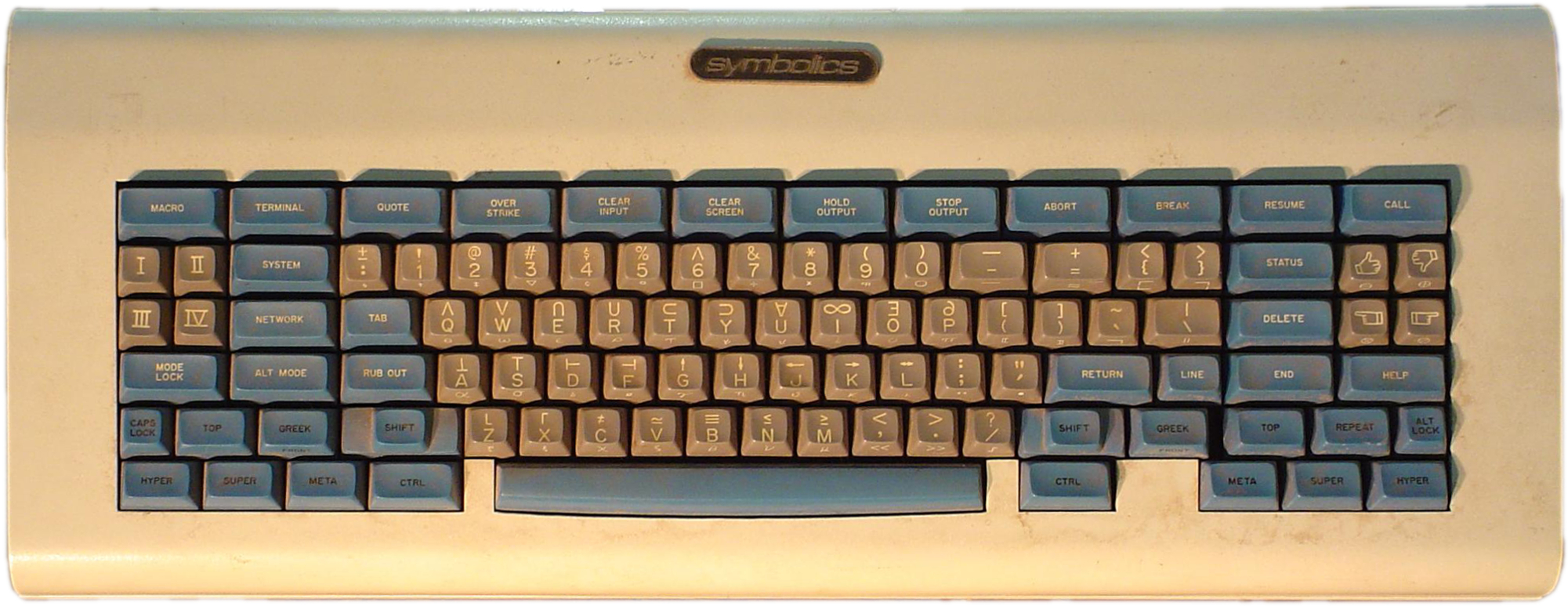
Space-cadet keyboard

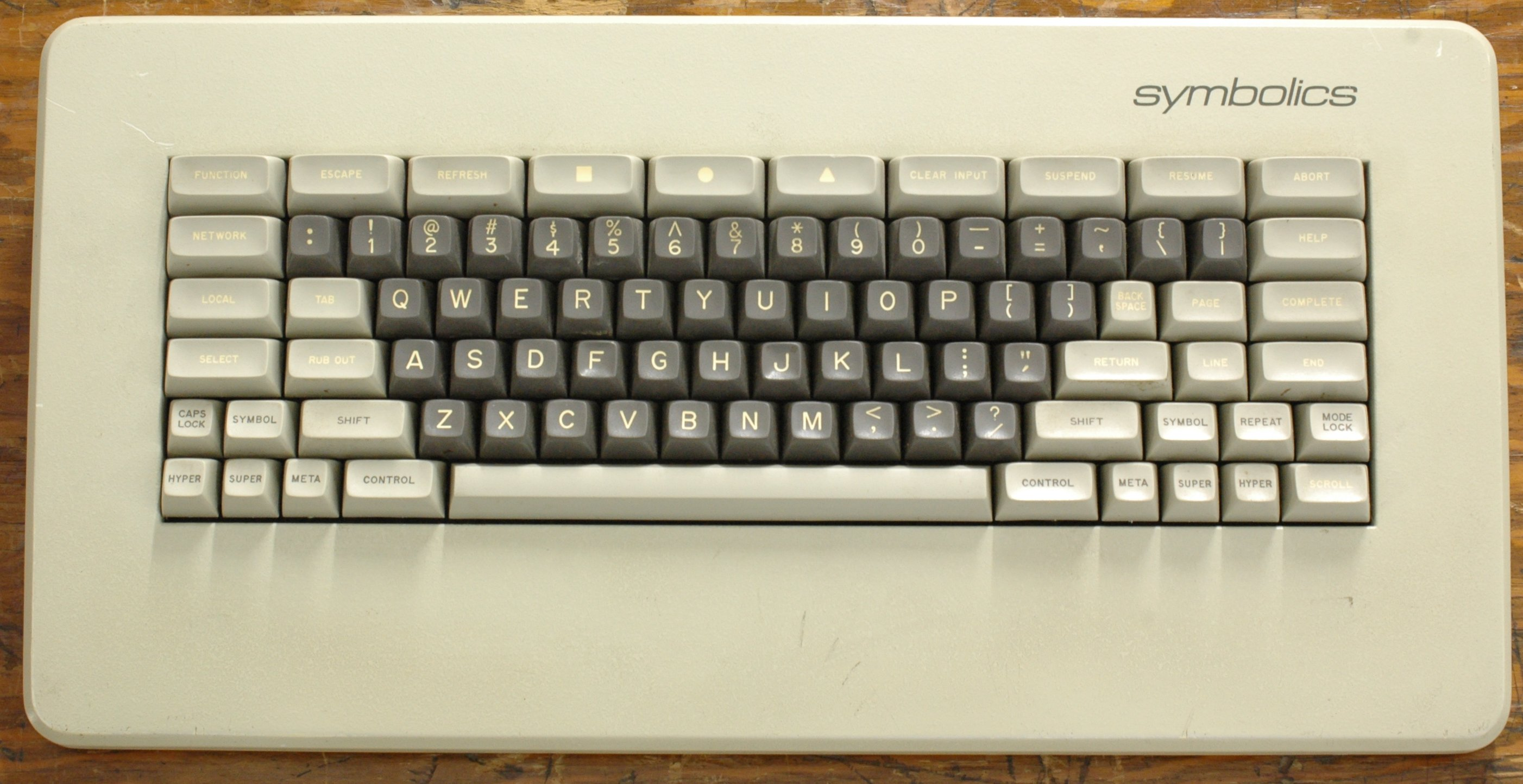
Symbolics keyboard

== See also ==
- Modifier key
