= Command button =

"Command button" may refer to:

- A graphical button that appears in a computer user interface, allowing a user to trigger an event
- Keyboard buttons (generally)
- The "command" key on Apple keyboards (a modifier key with a "⌘" symbol printed on it)

== See also ==
- Push-button
