= ADM-3A =

Early video display terminal

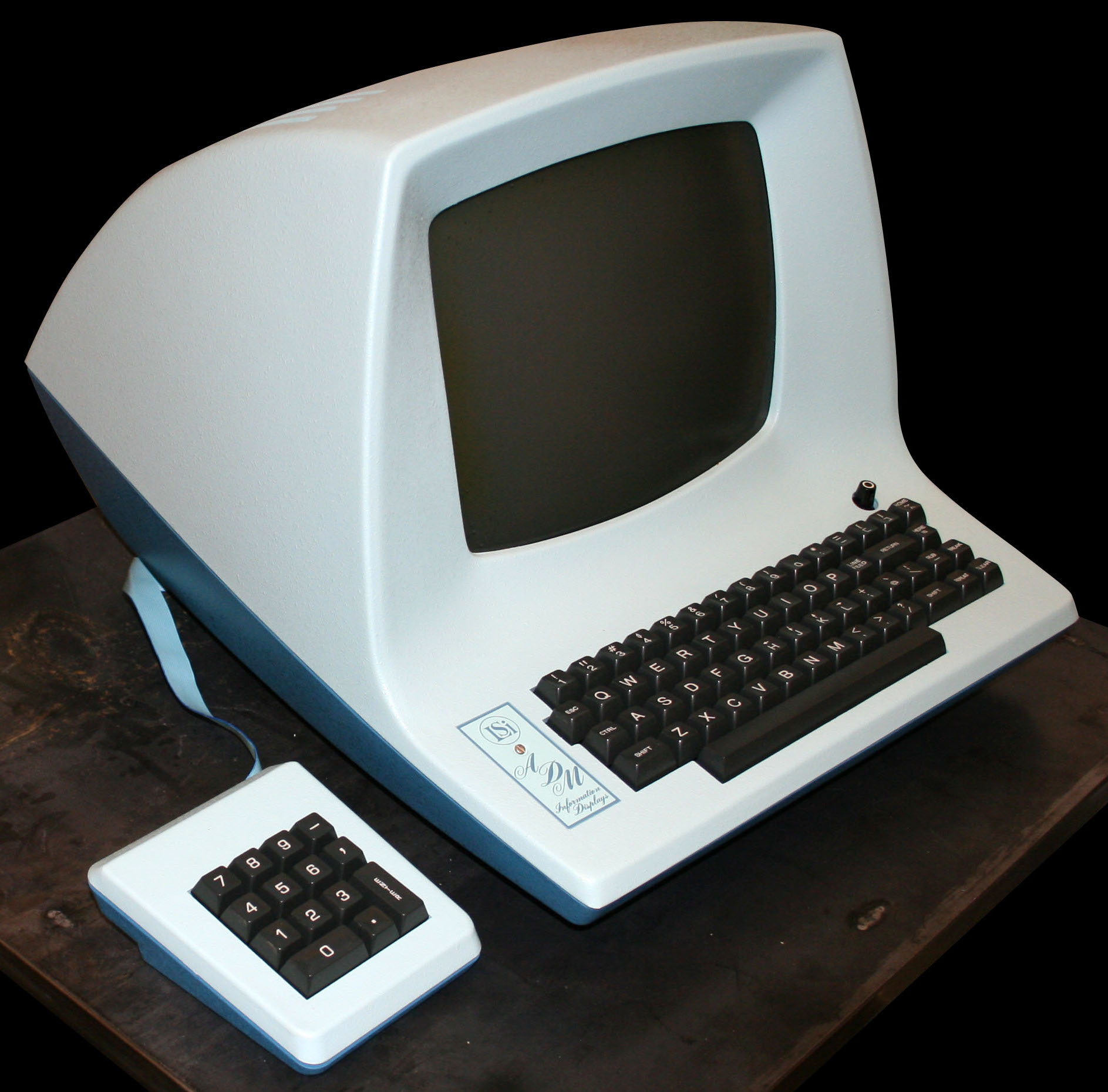
- Terminal with keypad
- Manufacturer: Lear Siegler
- Type: Computer terminal
- Released: 1976
- Introductory price: US$995 (equivalent to $5,600 in 2025)

The ADM-3A is an early influential video display terminal, introduced in 1976. It was manufactured by Lear Siegler and has a 12-inch screen displaying 12 or 24 lines of 80 characters. It set a new industry low single unit price of $995. Its "dumb terminal" nickname came from some of the original trade publication advertisements. It quickly became commercially successful because of the rapid increase of computer communications speeds, and because of new minicomputer and microcomputer systems released to the market which required inexpensive operator consoles.

== History ==
Lear Siegler, Inc. (LSI) manufactured its first video display terminal in 1972 – the 7700A.

In 1973, LSI hired a new head of engineering, Jim Placak. He and his team created the ADM-1 later that year. It set a new pricing low in the industry at $1,500. (Note: Equivalent to $11,000 in 2025.) Its lower cost was primarily due to a unique single printed circuit board design. In early 1973 the LSI division in Anaheim, California, that manufactured these and other products hired a management team for this product line – a VP, national sales manager, and one regional sales manager – for the western region. The ADM-1 was followed by the ADM-2 in early 1974. It has expanded functionality compared to the ADM-1 and a detached keyboard.

The initials "ADM" were referred to as meaning "American Dream Machine" in some advertising.

== ADM-3 ==
The ADM-3 followed, and the first manufactured units were introduced at the 1975 National Computer Conference in Anaheim, California, May 19–22, 1975, in booth 2348 at a price of $995. Its innovative wave-soldered single-board design, which includes the keyboard and all connectors, is packaged in an original clam shell enclosure.

Within weeks of the launch of the ADM-3, Dennis Cagan, Western Regional Sales Manager, started to book very large orders. Its "dumb terminal" nickname came from some of the original trade publication ads and quickly caught on industry wide. Due to two emerging trends, the device immediately became the best selling in the industry. Computer communications speeds were rapidly increasing, and a wave of general-purpose and dedicated single-application minicomputer systems were hitting the market from dozens of manufacturers. These required inexpensive operator consoles that could match the speeds. With no fast low-cost printers available, the ADM-3 (painted in a variety of custom colors for the OEMs) became the de facto standard. By December 20, 1976, the widely used Teletype Model 33 KSR electromechanical printing terminal, which could only print ten characters per second, sold for $895 or $32/month, while the ADM-3, which could display up to 1,920 characters per second, went for $995 or $36/month. The ADM-3 was also offered in kit form and sold in computer hobby stores for $840–$875.

== ADM-3 options ==
The original ADM-3 terminal displays only upper-case letters. In 1976, an option was added to allow it to display both lower and upper case. The base version of the terminal displays only 12 (rather than 24) rows of 80 characters. In those days RAM was expensive, and halving the character count halved the RAM requirement. Likewise, all upper-case required only 6 bits per character to be stored rather than 7. Further optional add-ons included a graphics card, enabling it to emulate a Tektronix 4010, and an extension port which allows daisy chaining several ADM-3As on a single RS-232 line.

== ADM-3A ==
In 1976, the ADM-3A was introduced. The ADM-3A added support for control codes to move the cursor around on the screen and directly position the cursor at any point in the display. It does not, however, support “clear to end of line” or “clear to end of screen”, or other more advanced codes that appeared in later terminals, such as the VT52 and VT100.

The ADM-3A's overall setup is controlled by 20 DIP switches under the nameplate at the front of the machine, beside the keyboard, including setting speed from 75 to 19,200 baud. The advanced configuration options allows split speed connection, sending at one rate, and receiving at another. Like the ADM-3 before it, the ADM-3A was offered as a kit. It was $200 less than an assembled unit.

== Hardware ==
ADM-3A keyboard layout

The 5×7 dot-matrix characters are displayed in amber, green, or white phosphor on black (the cursor is 7×9). The keyboard has 59 keys. The 12-inch monochrome CRT is mounted in the top half of the case, which is hinged in the back and opens like a clamshell. The CRT was typically made by Ball Brothers.

Unlike later terminals, such as the VT100, the ADM-3A does not use a microprocessor in its implementation, but instead uses 7400-series integrated circuits. It does, however, use RAM chips, rather than the circulating memory used by earlier terminals, such as the Datapoint 3300.

== Legacy ==
The use of the HJKL keys to move the cursor in the vi editor and in vi's descendants originated on the ADM-3A. vi was created at the University of California, Berkeley, shortly after the university began replacing the Teletype Model 33 with the ADM-3A the cursor-movement arrows were printed on those four keys. The Home key and tilde label printed on the ^ key may have additionally led to the establishment of the tilde character ("~") as the representation of the home directory in many Unix shells. The caret character is also commonly used to represent the beginning of line or "home" position in regular expression dialects; however, this was already being used by ed(1) in Unix v6, released in 1975, and in the Ritchie & Thompson qed editor from 1970.

The ←, ↓, ↑, → and Home labels printed on the H, J, K, L, and ~ ^ keys are a visual reference to the control characters Ctrl+H, Ctrl+J, Ctrl+K, Ctrl+L, and Ctrl+~ ^ that are required to move the cursor left, down, up, right, and to the top/left corner (or "Home" position) of the terminal, respectively. The Ctrl+H and Ctrl+J functions are the standard ASCII backspace and line feed respectively, but the interpretations of Ctrl+K, Ctrl+L, and Ctrl+~ ^ were a novelty, introduced by the ADM-3A. Also, as common with other terminals, Ctrl+G produces an audible beep unless disabled via DIP switch and Ctrl+I tabs the cursor to the next tabstop, with tabstops fixed at each 8th character position. Ctrl+Z is used to clear the screen.

The way vi-style text editors use Esc is a legacy of the Esc key's placement on the ADM-3A's keyboard, since these are the original terminals used to develop vi. On modern keyboards, Esc is more inconveniently located, most often in the function keys row. (Note: This is similar to how the extensive modifier keys in Emacs are easily used on the original keyboard (the space-cadet keyboard)—being placed together—but these keys have now been spread around the keyboard, and hence become more difficult to use.)

Finally, the Control key is located above, not below, the Shift key—in the same place where most modern PC keyboards put the Caps Lock key. (Note: Very early PC keyboards also have the Ctrl key located above the Shift key, just like the ADM-3A's keyboard.) Many standard Unix key combinations were designed with the QWERTY layout and the ADM-3A's original Ctrl key placement in mind. Many of those key combinations are still in use today, even on non-Unix operating systems. Seasoned computer users familiar with the original layout often claim that the different position of the Ctrl key on modern PC keyboard layouts makes the use of Ctrl key combinations more cumbersome. Solutions exist for many operating systems to switch around the Caps Lock and Ctrl keys in software, thus making the PC keyboard layout more closely resemble the ADM-3A's keyboard layout.

The legacy of the ADM-3A's keyboard also lives on in Japan, where the local layout follows it almost exactly. Local Mac keyboard layouts even retain the ADM-3A's position of the Control key, transposing it with the Caps Lock key.

== See also ==
- Teletype Model 33
