= Esc key =

Key on many computer keyboards

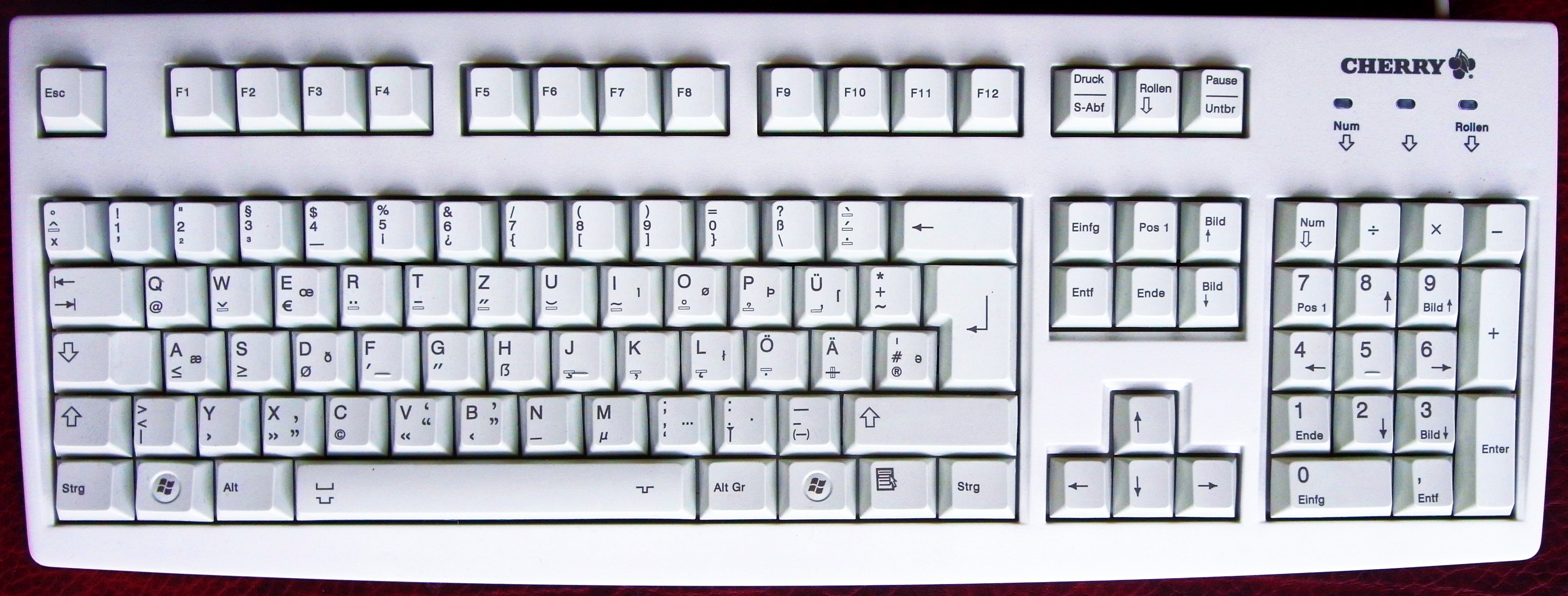
A computer keyboard with the Esc key in the top-left corner

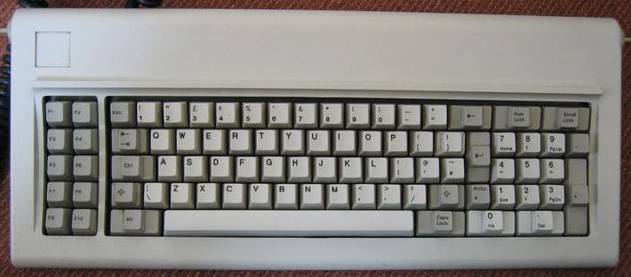
IBM 83-key keyboard (1981), with Esc in the top-left corner of the alphanumeric section

On computer keyboards, the Esc key Esc (named Escape key in the international standard series ISO/IEC 9995) generates the escape character, ASCII code 27 decimal, Unicode U+001B, or Ctrl+[). System or application software often interprets this as "stop", "cancel" or "exit".

It is now generally placed at the top left corner of the keyboard, a convention dating at least to the Digital VT50 terminal (1974). On teletypewriters, it was generally the leftmost key of the second row.

== Symbol ==
ISO keyboard symbol for "Escape"

The keyboard symbol for the ESC key (which may be used when the usual Latin lettering is not preferred for labelling the key) is standardized in ISO/IEC 9995-7 as symbol 29, and in ISO 7000 "Graphical symbols for use on equipment" as symbol ISO-7000-2029. This symbol is encoded in Unicode as U+238B broken circle with northwest arrow (⎋).

== Origins ==
The analogous key on some early Teletype Model 33 keyboards was labeled Alt Mode. This label referred to an alternative mode of operation in which the single next character was treated in a special way. The idea that such a functionality should be provided in a character encoding convention—and be referred to as escape—is among the contributions that Bob Bemer made to the development of the ASCII encoding around 1960.

== Uses ==
As most modern computer users are no longer concerned with controlling terminal or peripheral behaviour via manually typed or computer-issued escape sequences, the task to which Esc was originally dedicated, the escape key has long since been appropriated by application programmers, most often to mean Stop. This use continues today in Microsoft Windows's method of escape as a shortcut in dialog boxes for No, Quit, Exit, Cancel, or Abort, as well as a common shortcut key for the Stop button in many web browsers, and to cancel drag and drop operations.

Starting in Microsoft Windows 95, ⌃ Control+⎋ Esc has been equivalent to the Windows key, which opens the Start menu.

Starting with Windows 3.0, ⎋ Esc has been part of many keyboard shortcuts.

In macOS, "Esc" usually closes or cancels a dialog box or sheet. The ⌘ Command+⌥ Option+⎋ Esc combination opens the Force Quit dialog box, allowing users to end non-responsive applications.

In most computer games, the escape key is used as a pause button and/or as a way to bring up the in-game menu, usually containing ways to exit the program. This is despite the existence of a separate Pause/Break key.

ADM-3A keyboard layout used in vi development, with escape in what is now the Tab ↹ position

In the vi family of text editors, escape is used to switch modes. This usage is a legacy of the Esc key being conveniently placed in the top row on the ADM-3A terminal keyboard used to develop vi, in what on modern keyboards is now the tab position – yet on modern keyboards, Esc is now inconveniently located, most often in the function keys row. This is similar to how the extensive modifier keys in Emacs were easily used on the original keyboard (the space-cadet keyboard)—being placed together—but these keys have now been spread around the keyboard, and hence become more difficult to use.

The TECO editor uses ESCape as a delimiter when used once, and as an execute key when used twice in a row.

=== Escape sequences on KSR terminals ===
Old keyboard Send/Receive (KSR) printers, and visual display units (VDUs), would normally be controlled by escape sequences sent by the computer to the peripheral device, but there were situations where these devices could be used "off-line" with the keyboard effectively connected to the output device, and so the need could arise to type escape sequences "by hand" to control the peripheral. Although such devices are long out of use, standard processing of ANSI Escape sequences very similar to the 1970s VT100, is implemented in both ANSI.SYS and other more modern pseudo-terminal interfaces used in Unix-like environments, one example being Linux consoles, meaning newer, higher-level abstractions have not changed the fact that typing the escape key followed by something like the six characters [32;1m affects subsequent text in output, in this case turning it green.
