= Modifier key =

Class of key on a computer keyboard

In computing, a modifier key is a special key (or combination) on a computer keyboard that temporarily modifies the normal action of another key when pressed simultaneously. In general, pressing a modifier key on its own does nothing; therefore pressing any of the ⇧ Shift, Alt, or Ctrl keys alone will not usually trigger computer action. A modifier key will commonly be used in a defined sequence of key presses in conjunction with another key, triggering a specific action. These sequences are called keyboard shortcuts.

For example, in most keyboard layouts the Shift key combination ⇧ Shift+A will produce a capital letter "A" instead of the default lower-case letter "a" (unless in Caps Lock or Shift lock mode). A combination of Alt+F4 in Microsoft Windows will trigger the shortcut for closing the active window; in this instance, Alt is the modifier key. In contrast, pressing just ⇧ Shift or Alt will probably do nothing unless assigned a specific function in a particular program (for example, activating input aids or the toolbar of the active window in Windows).

User interface expert Jef Raskin coined the term "quasimode" to describe the state a computer enters into when a modifier key is pressed.

== Modifier keys on personal computers ==
The most common are:

- ⇧ Shift
- ⌃ Ctrl (Control)
- ⎇ Alt (Alternate) – also labelled ⌥ Option on Apple keyboards.
- ⇮ AltGr (Alternate Graphic)
- ◆ Meta – Meta key, found on MIT, Symbolics, and Sun Microsystems keyboards.
- ✦ Hyper – Hyper key, found on the Space-cadet keyboard
- ❖ Super – Super key, found on MIT, Symbolics, Linux, and BSD keyboards.
- ⊞ Win (Windows) – found on Windows keyboards.
- ⌘ Cmd – Command key, found on Apple keyboards. On older keyboards labelled ⌘  (Apple logo).
- Fn (Function) – often present on small-layout keyboards, or keyboard where the top row of function keys have multimedia functions like controlling volume attached.

The (Sun) Meta key, Windows key, (Apple) Cmd key, and the analogous "Amiga key" (A) on Amiga computers, are usually handled equivalently. Under the Linux operating system, the desktop environment KDE Plasma calls this key Meta, while GNOME calls this key, neutrally, Super. This could be considered confusing, since the original space-cadet keyboard and the X Window System recognize a "Meta" modifier distinct from "Super".

The ZX Spectrum has a Symbol Shift key in addition to Caps Shift. This was used to access additional punctuation and keywords.

The MSX computer keyboard, besides Shift and Control, also included two special modifier keys, Code and Graph. In some models, as in the Brazilian Gradiente Expert, the Code and Graph keys are labelled "L Gra" and "R Gra" (Left and Right Graphics). They are used to select special graphic symbols and extended characters.

Likewise, the Commodore 64 and other Commodore computers had the Commodore key at the bottom left of the keyboard.

Compact keyboards, such as those used in laptops, often have a Fn key to save space by combining two functions that are normally on separate keys. On laptops, pressing Fn plus one of the function keys, e.g., F2, often control hardware functions. Keyboards that lack a dedicated numeric keypad may mimic its functionality by combining the Fn key with other keys.

The MIT space-cadet keyboard had additional Top and Front modifier keys. Combined with standard modifiers, it could enter as many as 8,000 different characters.

Specialist typesetting machines, and word processors such as the Redactron, sometimes used multiple modifier keys to trigger mode changes e.g. for emboldened text or justification changes. This approach gradually became obsolete after software based on commodity hardware and operating systems adopted the WIMP metaphor which provided drop-down menus etc.

=== Accented characters ===
Some non-English language keyboards have special keys to produce accented modifications of the standard Latin-letter keys. In fact, the standard British keyboard layout includes an accent key on the top-left corner to produce àèìòù, although this is a two step procedure, with the user pressing the accent key, releasing, then pressing the letter key. These kinds of keys are called dead keys. The AltGr modifier produces the áéíóú sequence, or in conjunction with the Shift key, ÁÉÍÓÚ. Keyboards of some languages simply include the accented characters on their own keys. Some keyboards also have a Compose key for typing accented and other special characters. By pressing Compose, and then two other keys, something similar to a combination of the glyphs of the two previous keys will appear on the screen.

== Modifier only ==
It is possible to use a modifier key as a normal key.

In 2005 macOS app Quicksilver introduced a feature called modifier-only activation. If a modifier key (Command) is pressed for a short duration (under 300 ms) then released with no other key being pressed, this is taken as a trigger.

In 2012 this kind of use of a Modifier key appeared in Apple's dictation preferences under OS X Mountain Lion, where Apple introduced options like "Press Right Command Key twice" to launch dictation.

This functionality was further increased in macOS Sequoia (2024) with the addition of modifier-only keys to be used alone to activate shortcuts such as "show desktop", including Left Command, Left Option, Left Control, Left Shift, Right Command, Right Control, Right Option, Right Shift, and Fn. This effectively gives users nine extra keys to activate shortcuts.

== Dual-role keys ==
It is also possible to use (with some utility software) one key both as a normal key and as a modifier.

For example, you can use the space bar both as a normal Space bar and as a Shift. Intuitively, it will act as a standard Space when you want a whitespace, and a Shift when you want it to act as a shift. I.e. when you simply press and release it, it is the usual space, but when you press other keys, say X, Y and Z, while holding down the space, then they will be treated as ⇧ Shift plus X, Y and Z.

The above example is known as "SandS", standing for "Space and Shift" in Japan. But any number of any combinations are possible.

To press shift+space in the previous example, you need in addition to a space/shift dual role key, one of (a) another space/shift key, (b) a usual shift, or (c) a usual space key.

== See also ==
- Bucky bit
- Control character
- Function key
- Keyboard layout
- Space-cadet keyboard
- Table of keyboard shortcuts
- Emacs pinky - repetitive strain injury developed by too much use of control key, notably for Emacs users.
