= Space bar =

Long wide key on a typewriter or keyboard

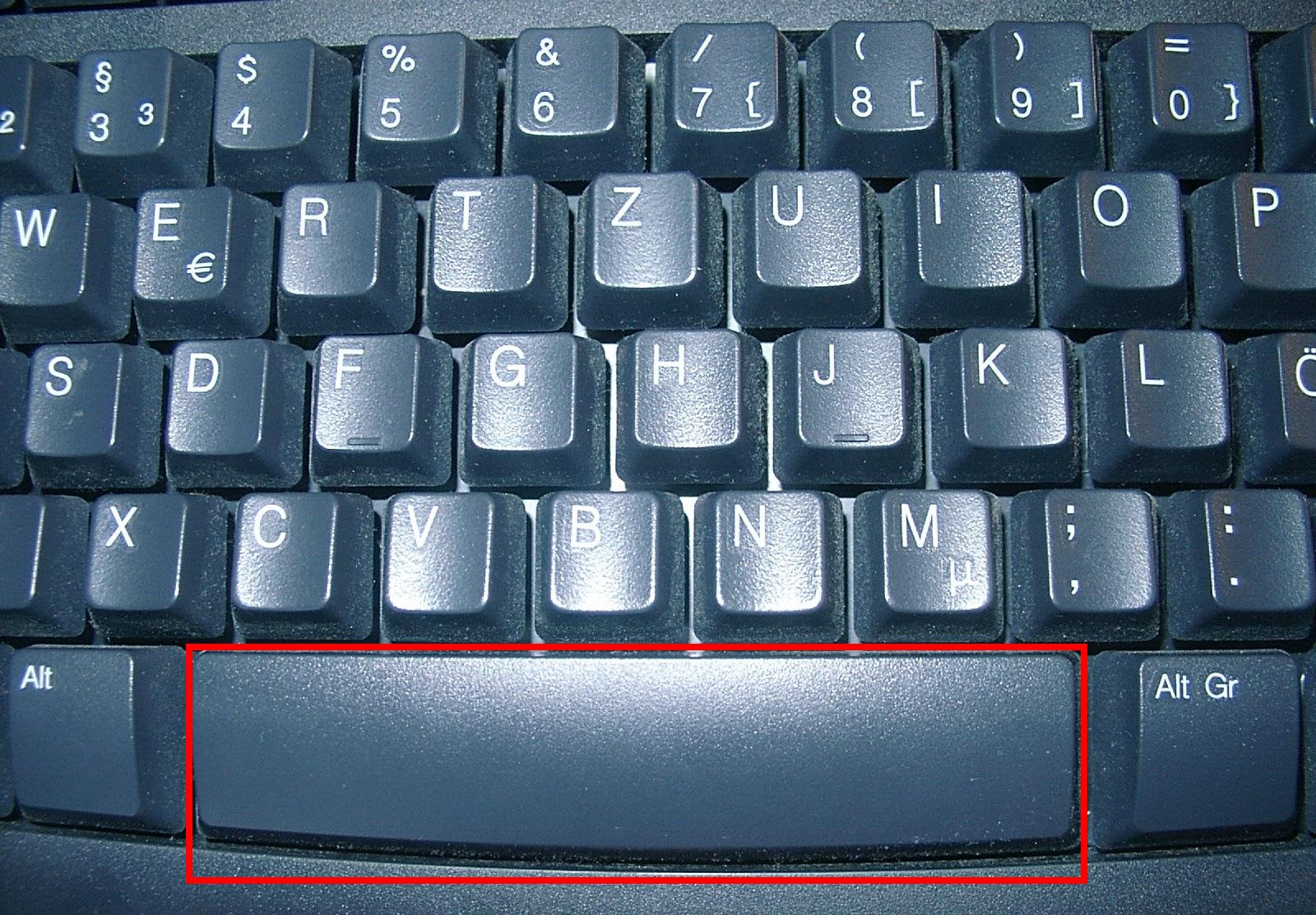
The space bar is on the bottom center of the keyboard.

The space bar, spacebar, blank key or space key is a key on a typewriter or alphanumeric keyboard in the form of a horizontal bar in the lowermost row, significantly wider than all other keys. Its main purpose is to conveniently enter a space, e.g., between words during typing, though it is also used in various non-text contexts such as video games or specialized software.

== History ==
On early typewriters in the late 19th century, the "bar" was literally a metal bar running across the full width of the keyboard (or even wider and even surrounding it) that triggered the carriage advance without firing any of the typebars towards the platen. Later examples gradually shrank and developed into their current more ergonomic form as a wide, centrally located but otherwise apparently normal "key", as typewriter (and computer) keyboards began to incorporate additional function keys and were more deliberately "styled". Although it varies by keyboard type, the space bar usually lies between the Alt key (or Command keys on Macintosh keyboards) and below the letter keys: C, V, B, N and M on a standard QWERTY keyboard. In some keyboards, both physical and especially virtual ones, the U+2423 ␣ OPEN BOX symbol is used to label the space bar.

Some early typewriter and particularly computer keyboards used a different method of inserting spaces, typically a smaller, less distinct "space" key which was also often set in a less central position, e.g. the Hansen Writing Ball, Hammond typewriters or the ZX Spectrum and Jupiter Ace ranges. The earliest known example, Sholes and Glidden typewriter used a lever to provide space between words, placing the invention of the inset space bar after 1843. However these methods were also usually just one part of similarly idiosyncratic full keyboard layouts, designed more to cope with particular technical requirements or limitations than with any sense of user-friendliness, and as such met with limited success, sometimes being dropped even on later models in the same line.

== Other uses ==
Depending on the operating system, the space bar used with a modifier key such as the control key may have functions such as resizing or closing the current window, half-spacing, or even backspacing. On web browsers, the space bar usually allows the user to page down or to page up when the space bar is used with the Shift key.

In many programs for playback of linear media (such as videos or music), the space bar is used for pausing and resuming playback, or for manually advancing through text.

In video games where the playable character can move and jump, the default key to jump is usually the space bar. This is typically used in conjunction with the WASD keys for up, down, left and right movement. Due to its central position and ease of access, the space bar is also frequently used in rhythm games, browser-based clicker challenges and speed tests that measure human input performance over fixed time intervals.

In emulators, the space bar is usually used to mimic action buttons on classic systems such as the Atari 2600.

In Japanese the space bar is used to cycle through different realizations of what is typed, as Japanese typically does not use spaces and uses multiple writing systems.
