= Knight keyboard =

Early 1970s computer keyboard used at the MIT-AI lab

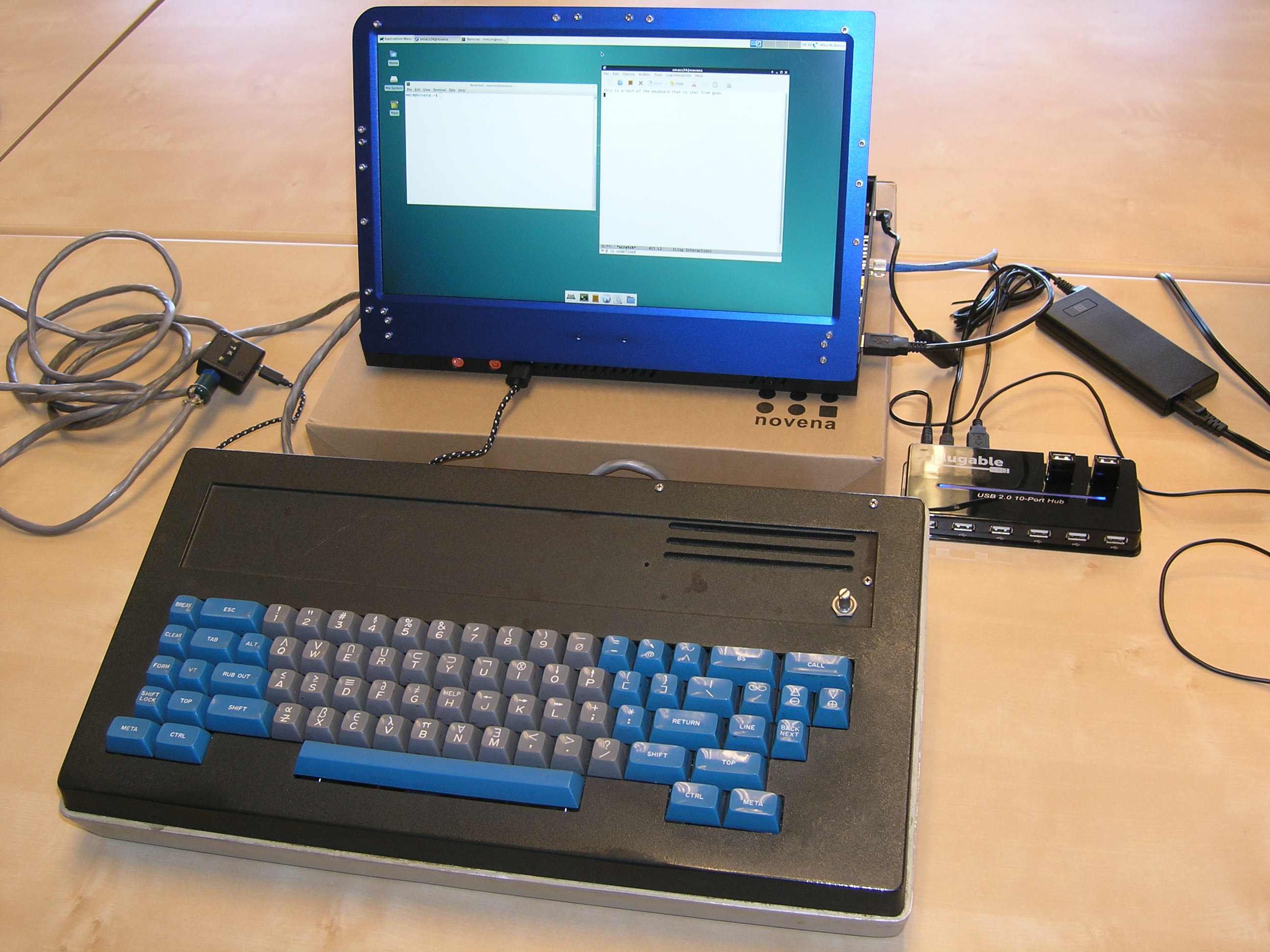
A Novena computer being used with a Knight keyboard

The Knight keyboard, designed by Tom Knight, was used with the MIT-AI lab's bitmapped display system. It was a precursor to the space-cadet keyboard and the later Symbolics keyboard.

== Influence ==
The Knight keyboard is notable for its influence on Emacs keybindings, particularly for helping popularize the meta key, which originated with the Stanford keyboard. The layout is also noteworthy: the meta key was outside the control key, which is opposite from the layout used on most modern keyboards, dating to the Model M IBM PC keyboard, which uses the Alt key instead, and places it inward to the control key.
