= Windows key =

Keyboard key meant for Windows devices

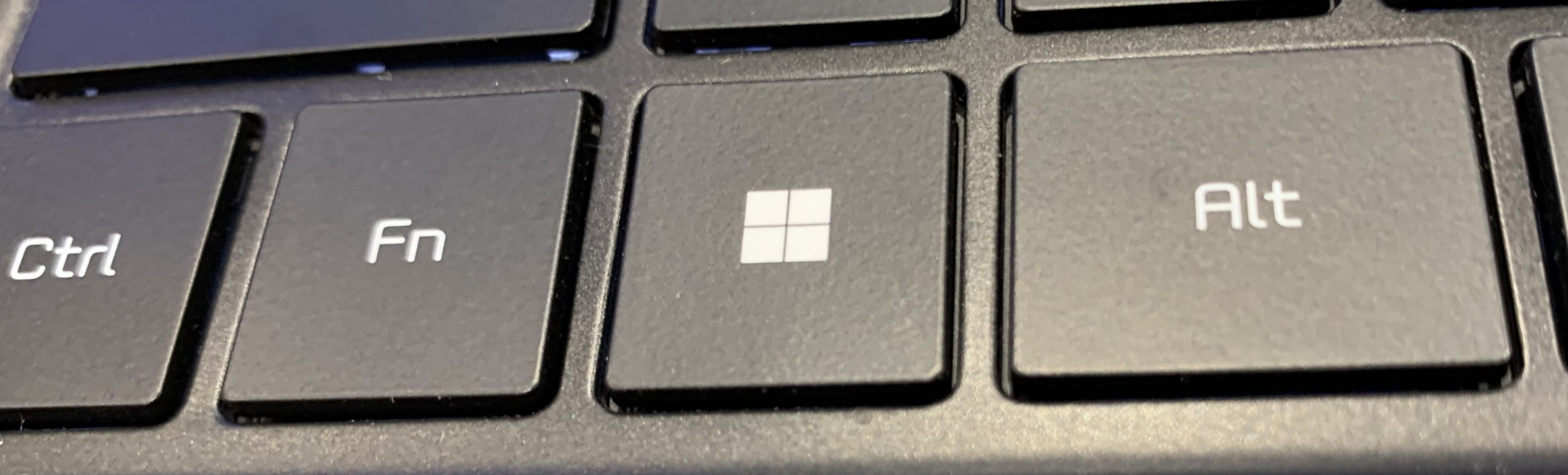
Current Windows key (center) with four equal squares, reflecting the Windows 11 and modern Microsoft logos in use since 2021

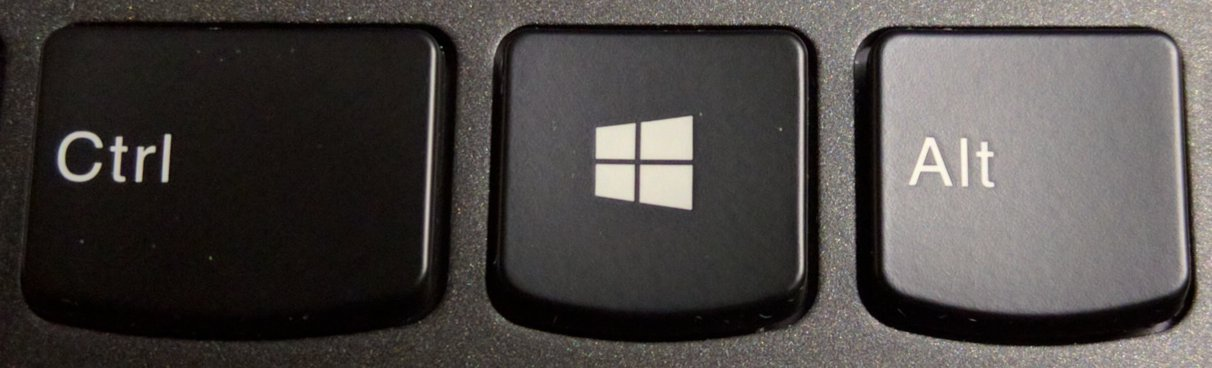
Windows 8 & 10 key with an isosceles trapezoid version of the Windows logo

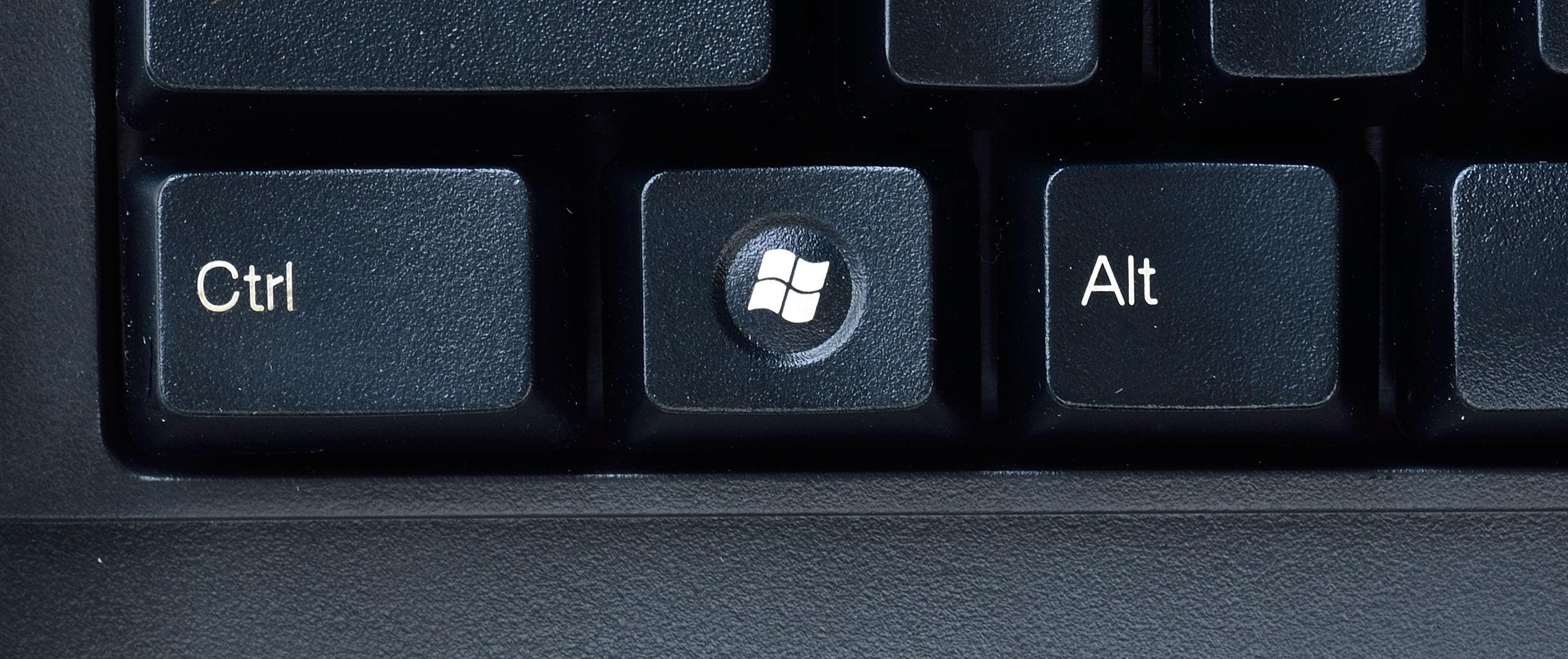
Windows Vista & 7 key with a centered logo within an orb

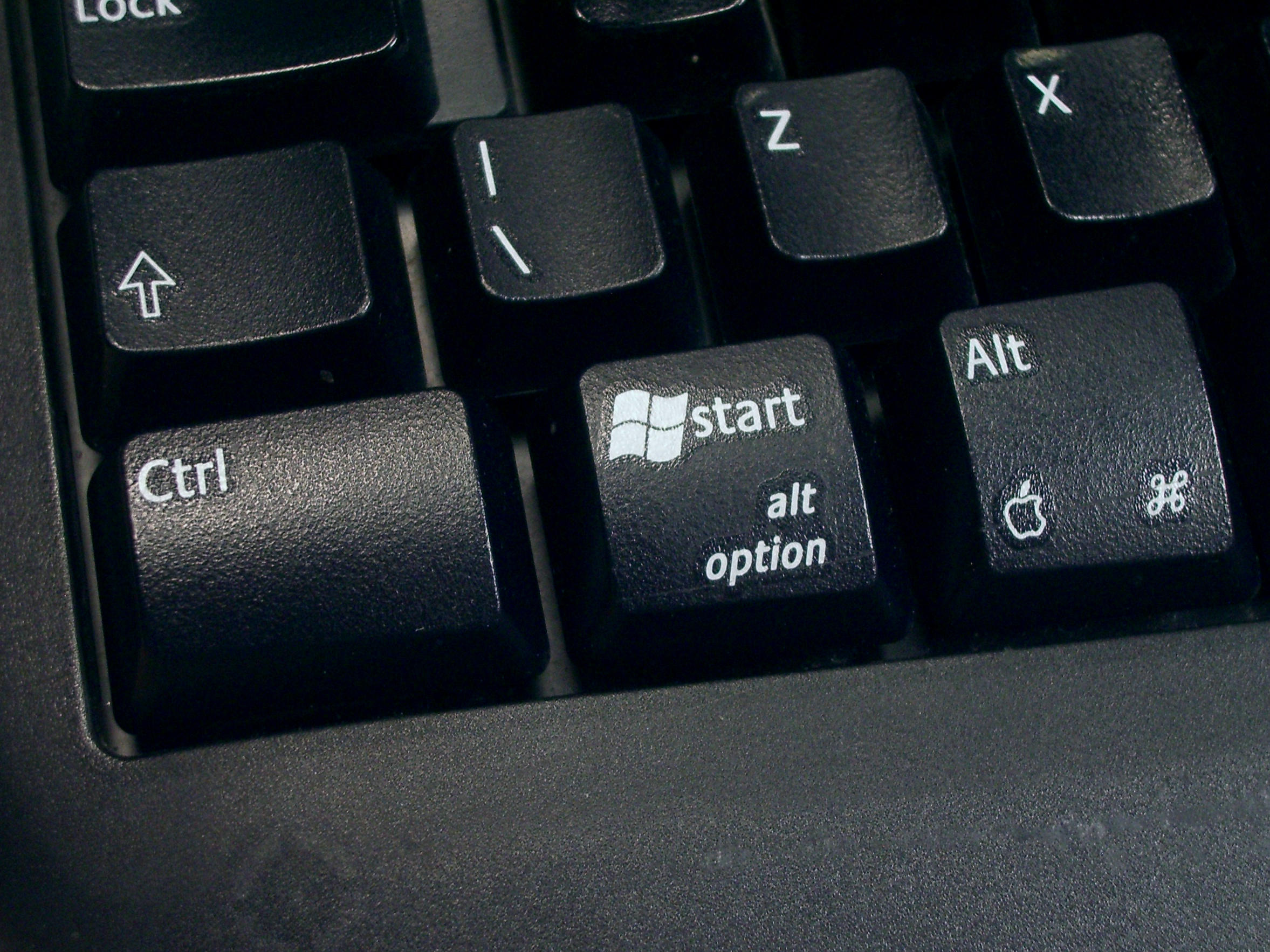
Windows XP key with the logo offset to the top left, also features the word "start"

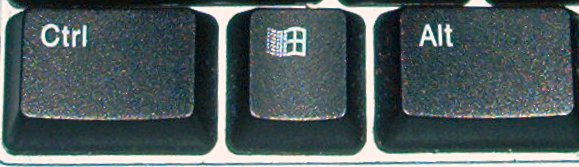
Original Windows key used with Windows 95 & 98, with the logo offset to the top left

The Windows key (also known as the win, start, logo, flag or super key) is a computer keyboard key originally introduced on Microsoft's Natural Keyboard in 1994. On Windows 95, it was used to open the start menu, and subsequently became standard on PC keyboards. In Microsoft Windows, Ctrl+Esc performs the same function, for keyboards which lack the key.

== History and usage ==
The Windows key was introduced with Microsoft's Natural Keyboard in 1994. The key was predated by the ⌘ Command key on Apple computers in the 1980s, and before that by the Super (or Meta) key on Lisp/Unix workstation computers in the 1970s.

The addition of two Windows keys and a menu key marked a change from the traditional 101 or 102-key keyboard to a 104- or 105-key layout for PC keyboards. One Windows key was placed between the left Ctrl and the left Alt and another, along with a menu key, was placed between the right Alt (or AltGr) and the right Ctrl key.

Windows 95 required the key to be on a keyboard to qualify for the addition of the "Designed for Windows" logo, and used it to open the Start menu. The key was soon added by virtually all desktop keyboard manufacturers. The first laptop to bear the Windows key was the Gateway Solo.

In laptops and other compact keyboards, it is common to have just one Windows key (usually on the left side). On Microsoft's Entertainment Desktop sets, designed for Windows Vista, the Windows key is in the middle of the keyboard, below all other keys, where the user's thumbs rests. Some keyboards during the Windows Vista and Windows 7 eras featured a circular bump surrounding the logo, distinguishing it tactility.

On Windows 8 tablet computers, hardware-certification requirements initially mandated that the Windows key be centered on the bezel, below the screen, except on a convertible laptop, where the button was allowed to be off-center in a tablet configuration. This requirement was relaxed in Windows 8.1, allowing the Windows key to be placed on any bezel or edge of the unit, though a central location along the bottom bezel was still preferred.

== Use within Windows ==
From Windows 95 to Windows 7, tapping the Windows key by itself traditionally revealed the Windows Taskbar (if hidden) and opened the Start menu. In Windows Server 2012 and Windows 8, the key launches the Start screen but does not show the taskbar. However, this feature was added back in Windows 10.

Pressing the key in combination with other keys (i.e., as a modifier key) allows the invocation of many common functions. Holding down Ctrl+Esc is not a substitute for the Windows key itself in these combinations. Which Windows key combinations ("shortcuts") are available and active in a given session depends on many factors, such as active accessibility options, the type of the session (regular or Terminal Services), the Windows version and the presence of specific software, such as IntelliType, and Group Policy, if applicable.

Below is a list of native shortcuts. The list is cumulative: unless otherwise noted, they were carried through to subsequent version of the operating system.

=== Windows 95 and Windows NT 4.0 ===
The following shortcuts are valid in Windows 95 and Windows NT 4.0.

- ⊞ Win opens the Start menu
- ⊞ Win+D shows the desktop (hiding even non-minimizable windows), or restores hidden windows when pressed a second time
- ⊞ Win+E opens Windows Explorer with folder pane on left side of window
- ⊞ Win+F opens Find files and folders
- ⊞ Win+M minimizes all windows
- ⊞ Win+⇧ Shift+M restores windows that were minimized with ⊞ Win+M
- ⊞ Win+R opens the "Run Program Or File" Window
- ⊞ Win+U runs Utility Manager
- ⊞ Win+Pause or ⊞ Win+Break opens System Properties
- ⊞ Win+F1 opens Windows Help
- ⊞ Win+Ctrl+F opens Find computers
- ⊞ Win+Tab ↹ cycles through taskbar buttons (this key combination is reassigned in Windows Vista and Windows 7)

=== Windows 2000 ===
Windows 2000 introduced the following:

- ⊞ Win+L locks the computer

=== Windows XP ===
Windows XP introduced the following:

- ⊞ Win+B selects the first icon in the Notification Area
- ⊞ Win+Ctrl+F opens Search for Computers (requires Active Directory Domain Services)
- ⊞ Win+L locks the computer and (if Fast User Switching is enabled) shows the user selection screen

=== Windows XP Media Center Edition ===
Windows XP Media Center Edition introduced:

- ⊞ Win+Alt+↵ Enter starts Windows Media Center

=== Windows Vista ===
Windows Vista introduced the following:

- ⊞ Win+Space bar brings the Windows Sidebar to the front
- ⊞ Win+G selects next Windows Sidebar gadget item, bringing all gadgets to the foreground in process. Gadgets were removed in Windows 8. It shows up the Xbox game bar in Windows 10 and 11.
- ⊞ Win+X invokes Windows Mobility Center. Works only if portable computer features are installed. This key combination is reassigned in Windows 8.
- ⊞ Win+Tab ↹ switches active app using Aero Flip 3D. Requires desktop composition, a feature of Windows Aero. Aero Flip 3D is removed in Windows 8 and this key is reassigned.
- ⊞ Win+Ctrl+Tab ↹ is same as above, but Aero Flip 3D remains even when this key combination is released. Arrow keys or mouse may be used to navigate between windows.
- ⊞ Win+0 through ⊞ Win+9 starts the corresponding Quick Launch Bar program. ⊞ Win+0 runs the tenth item. Quick Launch is removed in Windows 7 and this key is reassigned.

=== Windows 7 ===
Windows 7 introduced the following:

- ⊞ Win+Space bar activates Aero Peek. Reassigned in Windows 8.
- ⊞ Win+P toggles between the devices that receive video card's output. The default is computer monitor only. Other options are video projector only, both showing the same image and both showing a portion of a larger desktop.
- ⊞ Win+↑ maximizes the active window
- ⊞ Win+↓ restores the default window size and state of the active window, if maximized. Otherwise, minimizes the active window.
- ⊞ Win+← or → to align the window to the corresponding side of the screen, tiled vertically
- ⊞ Win+⇧ Shift+← or → to move the window to the next or previous monitor, if multiple monitors are used
- ⊞ Win+T to iterate through items on the taskbar from left to right
- ⊞ Win+⇧ Shift+T to iterate through items on the taskbar from right to left
- ⊞ Win++ to zoom into the screen at the mouse cursor position using the Magnifier Utility
- ⊞ Win+- to zoom out if the Magnifier Utility is running
- ⊞ Win+Esc to exit zoom
- ⊞ Win+1 through ⊞ Win+9, ⊞ Win+0 to either start or switch to the corresponding program pinned to taskbar. ⊞ Win+0 runs the tenth item. Press multiple times to cycle through the application's open windows. Press and release quickly to keep the taskbar's preview open (which allows you to cycle using arrow keys).
- ⊞ Win+Home minimizes all windows other than the active window. Pressing this combination a second time restores them.
- ⊞ Win+D minimizes all windows. Pressing the combination a second time restores them.

=== Windows 8 ===
Windows 8 introduced the following:

- ⊞ Win Opens the Start Screen
- ⊞ Win+C opens the charms. Reassigned in Windows 10.
  - ⊞ Win+F opens Search charm in file mode to search for computer files. If the Search charm is already open, switches to file search mode.
  - ⊞ Win+W opens Search charm in settings mode to search for PC Settings and Control Panel applets. If the Search charm is already open, switches to settings search mode.
  - ⊞ Win+Q opens Search charm in app mode to search for app shortcuts and executable files. If the search charm is already open, it has no effects.
  - ⊞ Win+H opens the Share charm.
  - ⊞ Win+K opens the Devices charm for printing, connecting to a second screen/projector, or pushing multimedia content via Play To.
  - ⊞ Win+I opens Settings charm, where app-specific settings, network options and shutdown button is located.
- ⊞ Win+X opens Quick Links menu and grants access to several frequently used features of Windows, such as accessing desktop or File Explorer. With Windows 8.1 update, it includes a shortcut to shut down or restart the computer.
- ⊞ Win+Z or right click opens the command bar for Metro-style apps. This bar appears at the bottom of the screen and replaces both context menu and toolbar in Metro-style apps.
- ⊞ Win+Tab ↹ invokes the app switcher and changes between Metro-style apps. Unlike Alt+Tab ↹, the app switcher does not include windows that appear on desktop.
- ⊞ Win+Space bar changes input method. Unlike Alt+⇧ Shift, this combination also causes a pop-up notification to appear.
- ⊞ Win+PrtScr or ⊞ Win+Volume up instantly saves a screenshot to the "Screenshots" folder in "Pictures" library. All screenshots are saved as PNG files.

=== Windows 8.1 ===
Windows 8.1 introduced the following:

- ⊞ Win+O locks device orientation
- ⊞ Win+S activates the Search Everywhere charm, opening a sidebar at the side of the screen.
- ⊞ Win+U activates the Ease of Access Center control panel applet.
- ⊞ Win+V cycles through notifications

=== Windows 10 ===
Windows 10 introduced the following:

- ⊞ Win+A opens Action Center
  - ⊞ Win+V or ⊞ Win+⇧ Shift+V cycles through notifications
- ⊞ Win+V opens the clipboard history (after October 2018 update)
- ⊞ Win+C activates Cortana listening mode. Reassigned in Windows 11.
- ⊞ Win+G opens the Game DVR bar (Xbox Game Bar)
  - ⊞ Win+Alt+R starts or stops recording. All recordings are saved in the "Captures" folder in the "Videos" library as an MP4 file.
  - ⊞ Win+Alt+G records the last 30 seconds when background recording is turned on for the game
  - ⊞ Win+Alt+T shows or hides the recording timer
  - ⊞ Win+Alt+PrtScr instantly saves a screenshot to the "Captures" folder in the "Images" library. All screenshots are saved as PNG files.
- ⊞ Win+I opens Settings
- ⊞ Win+F opens the Feedback Hub
- ⊞ Win+W opens the Widget panel
- ⊞ Win+Tab ↹ opens task view (opens timeline and remains after April 2018 Update)
- ⊞ Win+↑+← through ⊞ Win+↓+→ to align a window snapped to the right or left to the corresponding quadrant of the screen
- ⊞ Win+Ctrl+D creates a new virtual desktop
- ⊞ Win+Ctrl+⇧ Shift+B refreshes display in case of screen lockup
- ⊞ Win+Ctrl+F4 closes the active virtual desktop
- ⊞ Win+Ctrl+← or → switches between virtual desktops
- ⊞ Win+. or ; opens the emoji panel while typing (this was changed on the "May 2019 update")
- ⊞ Win+H opens the dictation toolbar (after Fall Creators Update)
- ⊞ Win+P brings up projection settings: PC screen only, Duplicate, Extend, Second screen only and Connect to a wireless display
- ⊞ Win+⇧ Shift+S Opens Snip & Sketch tool to capture screen selection and puts into clipboard
- ⊞ Win+Ctrl+⇧ Shift+Alt Opens website https://www.office.com/?from=OfficeKey,
- ⊞ Win+Ctrl+⇧ Shift+Alt+D Opens OneDrive
- ⊞ Win+Ctrl+⇧ Shift+Alt+L Opens website LinkedIn
- ⊞ Win+Ctrl+⇧ Shift+Alt+Y Opens website Yammer
- ⊞ Win+Ctrl+⇧ Shift+Alt+N Opens OneNote
- ⊞ Win+Ctrl+⇧ Shift+Alt+O Opens Outlook
- ⊞ Win+Ctrl+⇧ Shift+Alt+P Opens PowerPoint
- ⊞ Win+Ctrl+⇧ Shift+Alt+T Opens Teams
- ⊞ Win+Ctrl+⇧ Shift+Alt+W Opens Word
- ⊞ Win+Ctrl+⇧ Shift+Alt+X Opens Excel
- ⊞ Win+, Shows Desktop (ends when releasing the key ⊞ Win)
- ⊞ Win+Ctrl+C Enables or disables the color filters

=== Windows 11 ===
Windows 11 introduced the following:

- ⊞ Win+C Opens Copilot, formerly opened Microsoft Teams Chat flyout
- ⊞ Win+Z brings up snapping options that normally appear when hovering over the maximize/restore button with the mouse
- ⊞ Win+N opens the notification center and calendar
- ⊞ Win+Q opens Click to do on Copilot+ PCs

=== Microsoft Office ===
Various Microsoft Office applications introduced the following:

- ⊞ Win+⇧ Shift+S to take a screenshot for OneNote; conflicts with ⊞ Win+⇧ Shift+S on Windows 8.1
- ⊞ Win+E to open a new side note in OneNote
- ⊞ Win+⇧ Shift+N to open OneNote
- ⊞ Win+Y to open Skype for Business. This shortcut also places the cursor directly on the search bar (disabled in Skype for Business 2016)

Using aftermarket scripts, users can also create custom shortcuts.

== Use with other operating systems ==
The Windows key can also be used on other operating systems, though it usually carries a different name in them. Some cross-platform applications refer to the key as the OS key.

X/Wayland (used on Linux and similar) use the keysym "Super" for the Windows key(s), and toggles the MOD4 shift bit. Most Unix desktop environments use it much like Windows, with Super activating a primary menu similar to the Windows Start menu, and in combination with character keys performing actions such as run-command, often with the shortcuts and actions the same as Windows for familiarity. A common action that is not shared with Windows is for the Super key to allow dragging a window around from any location without raising it.

If one plugs a Windows keyboard into a macOS computer, the Windows key acts as the ⌘ Command. As Alt or AltGr acts as ⌥ Option, the physical locations of the keys that act as Command and Option are swapped. Plugging a Macintosh keyboard into a Windows (or Linux) machine does the reverse mapping and thus also swaps the Windows and Alt key locations.

If one plugs a Windows keyboard into a computer running ChromeOS, the Windows key acts as the Search key. A standard ChromeOS keyboard has this key in the location where Caps Lock usually is.

If one plugs a Windows keyboard into an Xbox 360, pressing the Windows key performs the same action as the Guide button on an Xbox 360 controller or Universal Media Remote, or Xbox 360 Media Remote, opening the Xbox Guide. Holding down the Windows key and pressing M opens a pop up conversation window over gameplay, if an instant message conversation is in progress. On an Xbox One or Xbox Series X/S, pressing the Windows key performs the same action as pressing the Xbox button on the controller.

On a PlayStation 3 console, pressing the Windows key performs the same action as the PS Button on the Sixaxis and DualShock 3, opening the XrossMediaBar.

== Licensing ==
Microsoft regulates the appearance of the Windows key logo with a specially crafted license for keyboard manufacturers. With the introduction of a new Windows logo with Windows XP, the agreement was updated to require that the new design be adopted for all keyboards manufactured after 1 September 2003. With the introduction of Windows Vista, Microsoft published guidelines for a new Windows Logo key that incorporated the Windows logo recessed in a chamfered lowered circle with a contrast ratio of at least 3:1 with respect to its background.

In the Common Building Block Keyboard Specification, all CBB compliant keyboards were to comply with the Windows Vista Hardware Start Button specification beginning on 1 June 2007.

== Windows command key symbols ==
=== Unicode ===
There are no Unicode symbols for the Windows command key, but there are two facsimile symbols that resemble the key on keyboards.

Symbol	Symbol name	Hex
⊞	Squared Plus	U+229E
🪟︎	Window	U+1FA9F

The 🪟 character can be shaded in black and white by appending U+FE0E, this is shown above.

=== Font packs ===
There are some font packs that include Microsoft Windows command key symbols.

Symbol	Font	Hex	Decimal
Windows 10/11 symbol	HoloLens MDL Assets	U+E782	59266
Windows 2000 symbol	Marlett	U+0057	0087
Windows 95 symbol	Wingdings	U+00FF	0255

== See also ==
- Copilot key
