= Shift key =

Key on typewriter or computer keyboard

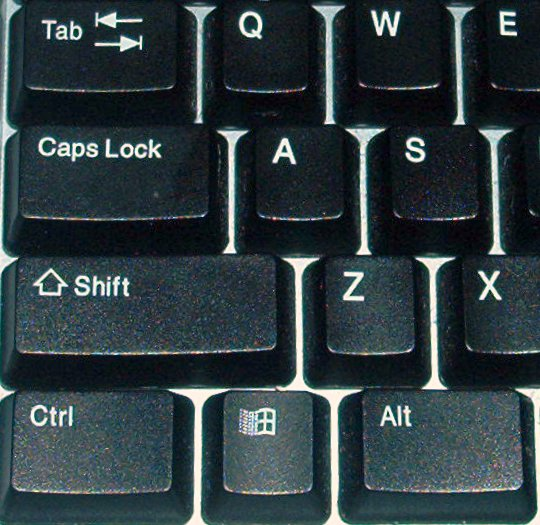
The Shift key on an English Windows keyboard (above the left "Ctrl" key)

The Shift key ⇧ Shift is a modifier key on a computer keyboard, used to type capital letters and other alternate "upper" characters. There are typically two Shift keys, often located to the left and right sides of the row below the home row.

The name originated from the typewriter, where one had to press and hold the button to shift the case stamp upward to change to a capital letter. It was first used in the Remington No. 2 Type-Writer of 1878, whereas the No. 1 model was capital-only.

On many keyboard layouts, characters that typically require the use of the Shift key include the parentheses, the question mark, the exclamation point, and the colon.

When the Caps Lock key is engaged, the Shift key may be held to type lowercase letters on many operating systems, though not on macOS or on Windows keyboard layouts that have the SGCAPS feature.

== Labeling ==
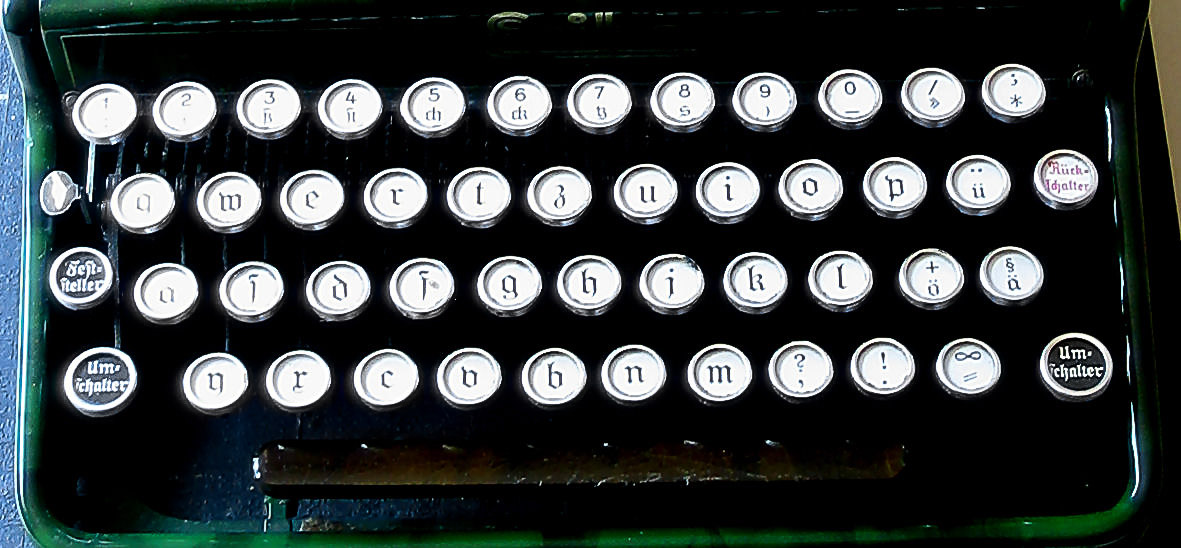
Keyboard of a German manual typewriter (early 20th century), with Shift keys labelled "Umschalter" ("switch")

Keyboard symbol for "Level 2 Select" (i.e. "Shift")

The keyboard symbol for the Shift key (which is called Level 2 Select key in the international standard series ISO/IEC 9995) is given in ISO/IEC 9995-7 as symbol 1, and in ISO 7000 "Graphical symbols for use on equipment" as a directional variant of the symbol ISO-7000-251. In Unicode 6.1, the character approximating this symbol best is U+21E7 upwards white arrow (⇧). This symbol is commonly used to denote the Shift key on modern keyboards (especially on non-US layouts and on the Apple Keyboard), sometimes in combination with the word "Shift" or its translation in the local language. This symbol also is used in texts to denote the Shift key.

== Uses on computer keyboards ==
On computer keyboards, as opposed to typewriter keyboards, the ⇧ Shift key can have many more uses:

- It is sometimes used to modify the function keys. Modern Microsoft Windows keyboards typically have only 12 function keys; ⇧ Shift+F1 must be used to type F13, ⇧ Shift+F2 for F14, etc.
- It can modify various control and alt keys. For example, if Alt+Tab ↹ is used to cycle through open windows, ⇧ Shift+Alt+Tab ↹ cycles in the reverse order, and using Ctrl+⇧ Shift+S could open a "Save as…" dialogue allowing to choose a new file name and directory instead of overwriting the current file.
- In most graphical systems using a mouse and keyboard, the ⇧ Shift key can be used to select a range. For example, if a file is selected in a list, Shift-clicking on a file further down the list will select the files clicked on plus the ones in between. Similarly, when editing text a Shift-click will select the text between the click point and the text cursor.
- The Shift key can be used in conjunction with the arrow keys to select text.
- Holding Shift while drawing with the mouse in graphics programs generally confines the shape to a straight line, usually vertically or horizontally, or to draw squares and circles using the rectangle and ellipse tools, respectively.
- The Shift key can also be used to modify the mouse behavior on a computer. For example, holding Shift while clicking on a link in a web browser might cause the page to open in a new window, or to be downloaded.
- In some web browsers, holding ⇧ Shift while scrolling will scan through previously viewed web pages.
- In mostly Pinyin Input Method, ⇧ Shift key usually use to switch between Chinese and lowercase English.
- In older versions of macOS (10.12 Sierra and below), holding ⇧ Shift while performing certain actions, such as minimising a window or enabling/disabling Dashboard or Mission Control, makes the animation occur in slow motion. For some animations, holding Control will make the animation move just slightly slower, and holding Control+⇧ Shift will result in an extremely slow-motion animation.
- Pressing either Shift key when the screen is blank or the computer is asleep will wake the computer.

On some keyboards, if both Shift keys are held down simultaneously only some letters can be typed. For example, on the Dell keyboard Model RT7D20 only 16 letters can be typed. This phenomenon is known as "masking" and is a fundamental limitation of the way the keyboard electronics are designed.

== Windows specific ==
The following is a list of actions involving the Shift key for the Microsoft Windows operating system.

Actions	Result	Windows versions
Press Ctrl+⇧ Shift+Esc	Opens the Windows Task Manager.	3.1+
Hold ⇧ Shift + click Restart	Reboots Windows only and not the entire system.	95, 98, ME
Hold ⇧ Shift + insert CD	Holding Shift while inserting a compact disc in a Microsoft Windows computer will bypass the autorun feature. This ability has been used to circumvent the MediaMax CD-3 CD copy protection system.	95+
Hold ⇧ Shift + click close button	In Windows Explorer, closes the current folder and all parent folders.	95+
Press ⇧ Shift+Delete	In Windows Explorer, if pressed with objects selected, such as files and folders, this will bypass the Recycle Bin and delete the selected objects permanently. Alternatively, holding Shift and selecting the Delete option in the context menu of the selected objects will achieve this. Retrieving deleted objects after this is only possible using recovery software.	95+
Press ⇧ Shift+Tab ↹	Focuses on the previous object in the objects that are focusable in many Windows applications, such as the previous form control on a form in Internet Explorer.	3.1+
Press ⇧ Shift 5 times	Toggles StickyKeys on and off.	95+
Hold the right ⇧ Shift for 8 seconds	Toggles FilterKeys on and off.	95+
Press both ⇧ Shift keys	Deactivates StickyKeys if it is activated.	95+
Press left Alt + left ⇧ Shift + Num Lock	Toggles MouseKeys on and off.	95+
Press left Alt + left ⇧ Shift + Print Screen	Toggles High Contrast on and off.	95+
Press ⊞ Win+⇧ Shift+Tab ↹	Highlights the last task in the task bar. Continue to cycle through the taskbar with the arrow keys, ⊞ Win+Tab ↹ (forward), ⊞ Win+⇧ Shift+Tab ↹ (reverse), or alphanumeric keys (highlights the task that begins with the alphanumeric character that is pressed). Press Space Bar or ↵ Enter to open the task.	95+
Press Alt+⇧ Shift+Tab ↹	Displays a list of the tasks in the task bar for as long as the Alt is held down. Selects the last task in the list. Continue to cycle through the list by pressing ⇧ Shift+Tab ↹. Release Alt to open the selected task.	3.1+
Press Ctrl+⇧ Shift+Tab ↹	Selects the previous tabbed window in any Windows applications is that use the tabbed window control.	3.1+
Press ⊞ Win+⇧ Shift+S	Opens Snip & Sketch	10+

== See also ==
- AltGr key
- Command key
- Option key
- StickyKeys
