= Common Building Block =

Discontinued technical standards for laptop components

- Developer: Intel Corporation
- Type: Laptop platform
- Released: 2005
- Successor: Ultrabook specification

Common Building Block (CBB) was a set of technical standards for laptop components introduced by Intel in 2005, and adopted by some manufacturers, including Asus, Compal, and Quanta.

== Creation ==
In 2004, the Common Building Block program promoted the use of industry-accepted mechanical and electrical specifications for three notebook components: 14.1-inch, 15-inch, and 15.4-inch liquid crystal displays (LCDs); 9.5mm and 12.7mm optical disc drives (ODDs); and 2.5-inch hard disk drives (HDDs). The program consisted of:

- A Web site to provide a centralized repository of information about the program, participants, and platform and ingredient specifications
- A continually updated list of CBB-compliant ingredients (submitted by suppliers)
- A testing and verification service for candidate products

The defunct repository site mobileformfactors.org was established to standardize components, and included:

- Hard disk drives
- Optical disc drives
- Liquid crystal display panels
- Battery packs
- AC/DC power adapters
- Keyboards
- Customizable notebook panels

== Hard drives ==
Only the 2.5 inch hard drive is a component used by CBB and its design guide does not address the integration of 1.8 inch hard drives.

A notebook should support 2.5 inch SATA or PATA HDDs that are designed based on the SFF Committee Specifications, The target CBB thickness for 2.5 inch HDDs in 2006 was 9.5mm with a tolerance of +/-0.2mm, as that was the form factor most used.

The HDD could be mounted with side or bottom mounting, a hard drive should comply with both, but the system could choose whichever was best suited for the application.

The electrical interface for SATA HDDs should follow the electrical interface standards set by the Serial ATA International Organization (SATA-IO). For PATA HDDs they should support the specifications defined by the T13 Committee.
