= Super key (keyboard button) =

Computer key

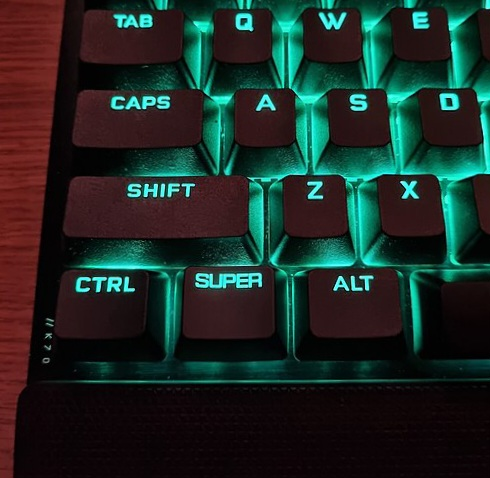
The Super key, located between the Control key and the Alt key, on an English US style PC keyboard

The Super key (❖ Super) is the original name for what is commonly labeled as the Windows key or Command key on modern computer keyboards, typically bound and handled as such by Linux and BSD operating systems and software today.

The Super key was originally a modifier key on a keyboard designed for Lisp machines at MIT.

== History ==
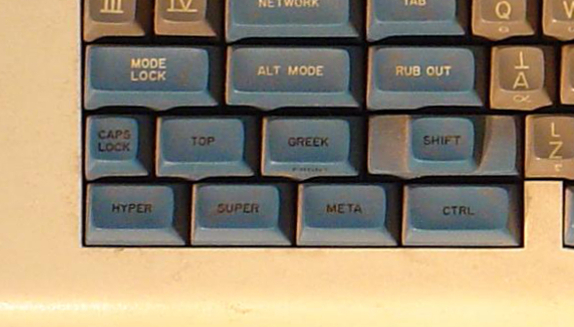
The modifier cluster on the bottom-left of the space-cadet keyboard _{Present: Alt Mode / Top, Greek, ⇧ Shift / Hyper, Super, Meta, and Control}

The "space-cadet" keyboard, designed in 1978 at MIT for the Lisp machine, introduced two new modifier keys, "Super" and "Hyper", compared to the earlier Knight keyboard also used with Lisp machines. Both keys became supported in the powerful Emacs text editor, which had, or would receive, influential ports on Multics, Unix, and many other operating systems, and saw wide adoption at institutions beyond MIT.

Beginning in 1984, the X Window System (a graphical user interface standard for Unix-like operating systems) supported the Meta, Super, and Hyper modifiers, as well as the common Shift, Control, and Alt keys. Unix workstations of that era sometimes featured Super keys located between the Control and AltGr or Meta keys (sometimes including a Compose key), but the eventual dominance of the IBM Model M 101/102-key layout (which only had Ctrl, Alt, and Shift modifiers) would make the keys unavailable on any modern hardware.

Despite the disappearance of these keys, many of Emacs' complex commands still required use of them, and the X11 technical UI standards for Unix still supported them, so these were soon a target to be emulated with alternative key combinations. Emacs emulated Meta+x with Escx or Alt+x (it still described these keys as "M-x" where M- means "Meta"). Emacs commands using the Super and Hyper keys were not emulated and gradually fell into disuse, replaced with incompatible sequences starting with Ctrl+x or Alt+x.

In 1994, the ⊞ Windows key first appeared on the popular Microsoft Natural Keyboard. It was in the same general location as the old workstation Super or Meta keys, in a space that the 101/102-key layout hadn't used. The subsequent proliferation of the Windows key as a part of the standard 104/105-key layout offered a new option to map another input modifier key expected in the Unix world. At first, around 1996, it was common practice to make the Windows key act as Meta. However, because of the existing alternative keys for Meta in Emacs, the reintroduction of a hardware Meta key binding did not prove exceptionally useful. This made Super the next most frequently emulated key of choice, and thus it became the standard assignment for the Windows key under X11.

Most Linux software and documentation calls these keys "Super" keys. However, they are still referred to as KEY_LEFTMETA and KEY_RIGHTMETA in the kernel, and some documentation such as that of KDE Plasma refers to it as just the Meta key. "Windows" and ⌘ are also used in documentation.

== Usage ==
Most Linux desktop environments use the Super key in a way very similar to Windows. By itself it pops up a menu of things the user can make the computer do, similar to the Start Menu (for instance in GNOME 3 it pops up the activities window), while when combined with another key it pops up another system window or does another action similar to Windows. A common function that is not shared with Windows is for the Super key to make the mouse drag a window around from any location, or the scroll wheel to zoom in/out.

Some systems block the Super key from getting to an application (usually a setup option is provided to change this but it requires another key such as Alt to be used, or removes all ability to use the Super shortcuts). Some traditional window managers such as Openbox have no Super bindings by default. Emacs still allows keybindings using Super, though currently none of the built-in commands use it by default.

== In other OSes ==
On modern keyboards, the Super key, the Windows key, and the macOS Command (or "Apple") key all send the exact same information to the computer and cannot be distinguished, thus all of them act like each other if you mix keyboards with different machines.

ChromeOS refers to the "Super" or Windows key on external keyboards as "External Meta".
