= Command key =

Computer key

⌘o

Command key
- In Unicode: U+2318 ⌘ PLACE OF INTEREST SIGN

The Command key (sometimes abbreviated as Cmd key), ⌘, formerly also known as the Apple key or open Apple key, is a modifier key present on Apple keyboards. The Command key's purpose is to allow the user to enter keyboard commands in applications and in the system. An "extended" Macintosh keyboard—the most common type—has two command keys, one on each side of the space bar; some compact keyboards have one only on the left.

The ⌘ symbol (the "looped square") was chosen by Susan Kare after Steve Jobs decided that the use of the Apple logo in the menu system (where the keyboard shortcuts are displayed) would be an over-use of the logo. Apple's adaptation of the symbol—encoded in Unicode at U+2318—was derived in part from its use in Nordic countries as an indicator of cultural locations and places of interest. The symbol is known by various other names, including "Saint John's Arms" and "Bowen knot".

== History ==
Apple's computers up through the 1979 Apple II Plus did not have a command key. The first model on which it appeared was the 1980 Apple III, where there are two monochrome Apple keys, both to the left of the space bar on the lowest row of the keyboard. Two other early Apple computers, the 1982 Apple IIe and the 1984 Apple IIc, also had two such keys, one to the left and one to the right of the space bar; in these models, they mapped to the first two fire buttons of an attached joystick. This allowed for flexible combinations of a modifier key and base key (such as Open-Apple with C for Copy) with just a few extra wires and no ROM changes, since the Apple II could only register one key press at a time (Shift and Control keys were handled in the keyboard encoding hardware which generated ASCII codes). In all these cases, the left Apple key had an outlined "open" Apple logo, and the one on the right had an opaque, "closed" or "solid" Apple logo key. The Apple Lisa had only the closed Apple logo.

When the Macintosh was introduced in 1984, the keyboard had a single command key with a looped square symbol (⌘, U+2318), because Steve Jobs said that showing the Apple logo throughout the menus as a keyboard shortcut was "taking [it] in vain". Thus, the ⌘ symbol appears in the Macintosh menus as the primary modifier key symbol. The original Macintosh also had an Option key, which was used primarily for entering extended characters.

In 1986, the Apple IIGS was introduced. Like the newer Macintosh computers to come, such as the Macintosh SE, it used the Apple Desktop Bus for its keyboard and mouse. However, it was still an Apple II. Apple changed the keys on the IIGS's keyboard to Command and Option, as on Mac keyboards, but added an open-Apple to the Command key, for consistency with applications for previous Apple II generations. (The Option key did not have a closed-Apple, probably because Apple II applications used the closed-Apple key much more rarely than the open-Apple key; thus there was less need to keep it around.) Because any ADB keyboard could be used with the IIGS, all of Apple's ADB keyboards—even those intended for the Mac—also included the open-Apple, and it stuck for more than twenty years, causing confusion long after the Apple II series went out of production.

The Apple symbol was removed in the keyboard's 2007 redesign, making room for the key's name to appear—the word "command" is now printed on the key.

== NeXT ==
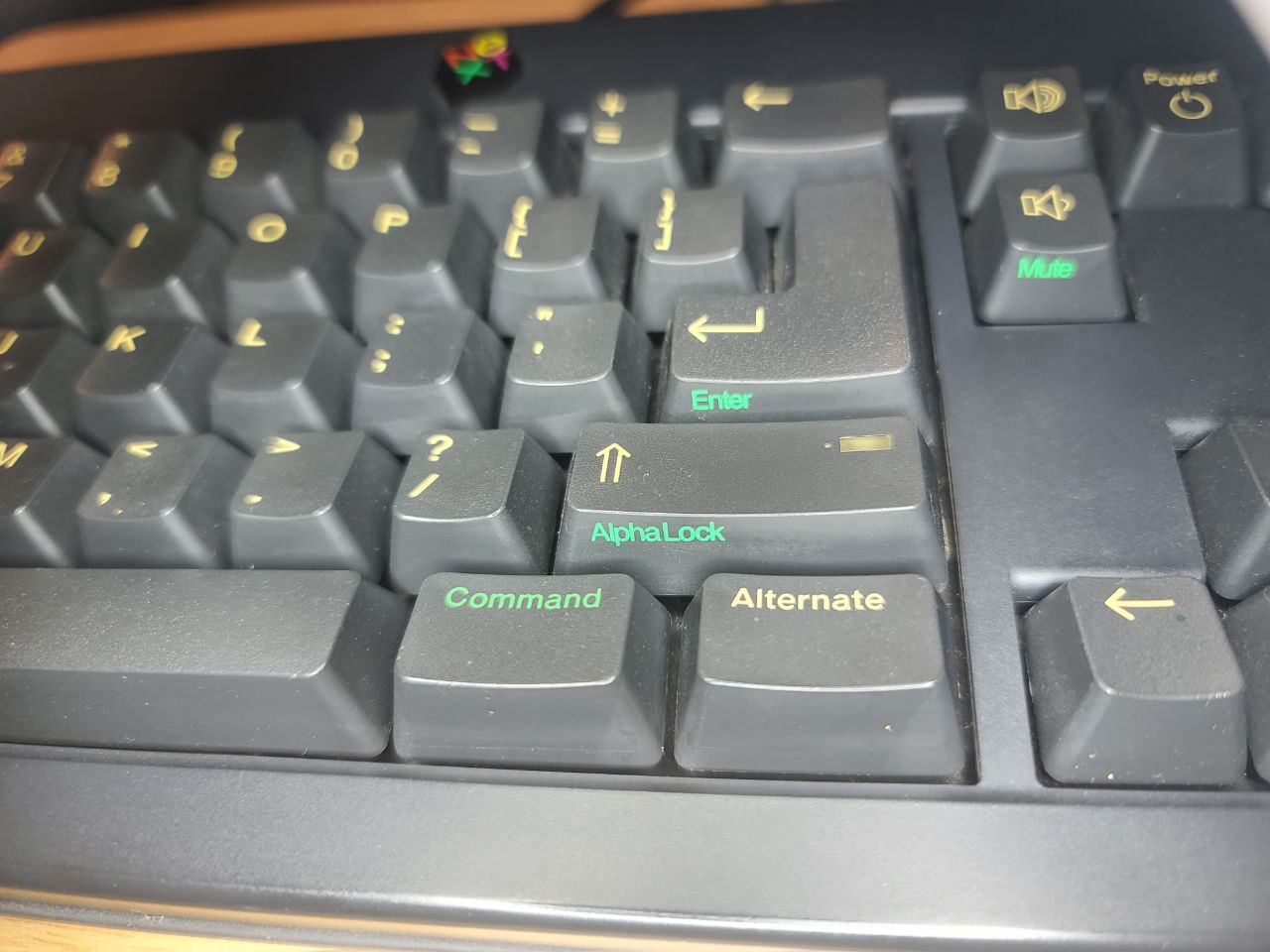
NeXT keyboard command key

On the keyboard of the NeXT Computer the equivalent key was marked command in green. The menus were not marked with a symbol denoting the command key.

Besides being used as a modifier key for keyboard shortcuts it was also used to alter the function of some keys. Command+⇧ Shift toggles alpha lock, command+return sends Enter and command+🔉 toggles Mute.

The functions were printed in green on the front side of the modified keys. This was also done on the Z, X, C and V keys (Undo, Cut, Copy and Paste).

(Left) command-option-* triggers a non-catchable hardware reset thereby hard rebooting the computer. (Contrary to Ctrl+Alt+Del on a PC compatible computer which triggers only a software reset.)

On the NeXT ADB keyboard, the Command keys were replaced by keys labeled help and the Command key morphed into a wide Command bar in front of the space bar.

== Function ==
The purpose of the Command key is to allow the user to enter keyboard shortcuts in applications and in the system. The Macintosh Human Interface Guidelines have always recommended that developers use the Command key (and not the Control or Option keys) for this purpose. A small set of keyboard commands (such as cut and paste, open and save) are standard across nearly all applications, and many other commands are standardized (Find, Show Fonts). If an application needs more shortcuts than can be obtained with the twenty-six letters of the Latin alphabet, double modifiers such as Command+Option are used.

One advantage of this scheme, as contrasted with the Microsoft Windows mixed use of the Control and Alt keys, is that the Control key is available for its original purpose: entering control characters in terminal applications. (Indeed, the very first Macintosh lacked a Control key; it was soon added to allow compatible terminal software.)

The Macintosh keyboard's other unusual modifier key, the Option key, serves as a modifier both for entering keyboard shortcuts and for typing text—it is used to enter foreign characters, typographical symbols, and other special characters.

== Origin of the symbol ==
Swedish road sign no. H22

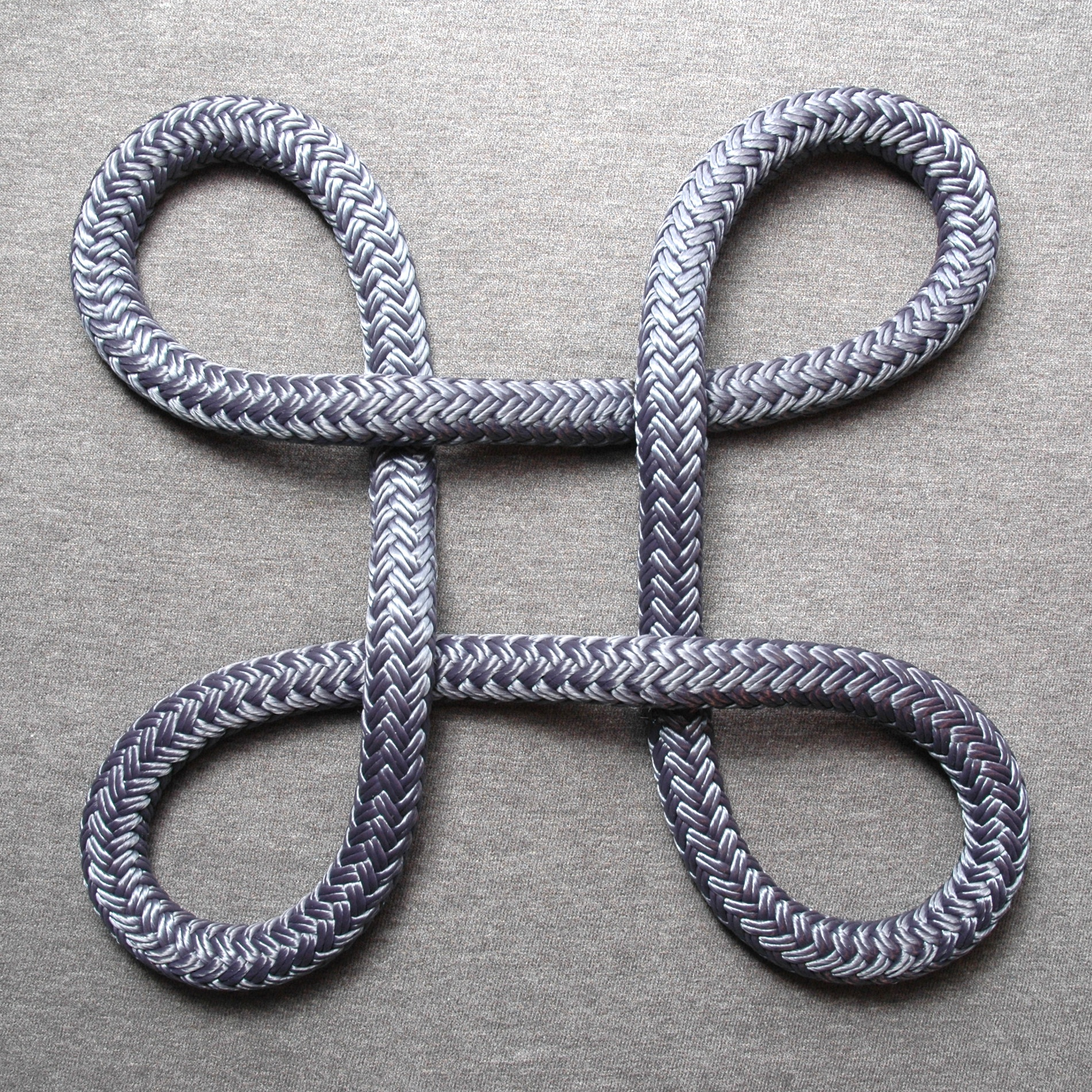
A Bowen knot

The ⌘ symbol came into the Macintosh project at a late stage. The development team originally went for their old Apple key, but Steve Jobs found it frustrating when "apples" filled up the Mac's menus next to the key commands, because he felt that this was an over-use of the company logo. He then opted for a different key symbol. With only a few days left before deadline, the team's bitmap artist Susan Kare started researching for the Apple logo's successor. She was browsing through a symbol dictionary when she came across the cloverleaf-like symbol, commonly used in Nordic countries as an indicator of cultural locations and places of interest (it is the official road sign for tourist attraction in Denmark, Finland, Iceland, Norway, and Sweden, and the computer key has often been called Fornminne—ancient monument—by Swedish Mac users and Seværdighedstegn—landmark signs—by Danish users). When she showed it to the rest of the team, everyone liked it, and so it became the symbol of the 1984 Macintosh command key. Susan Kare states that she has since been told that the symbol was picked for its Scandinavian usage due to its resembling the shape of a square castle with round corner towers as seen from above looking down, notably Borgholm Castle. However, the symbol is used in many places in Scandinavian history, for example on a 5th-century picture stone from Gotland, and first usage of the shape as a sign for a place of interest was suggested by the Finnish Local Heritage Federation in the 1950s.

The symbol was included in the original Macintosh font Chicago, and could be inserted by typing a Ctrl+Q key combination.

In Unicode and HTML it is encoded as U+2318 ⌘ PLACE OF INTEREST SIGN.

== On other keyboards ==
On USB keyboards, the ⌘ Command keys are mapped to standard keycodes reserved for GUI functions.

When using a Macintosh computer with a keyboard lacking ⌘ Command keys, the ⊞ Windows keys used on Microsoft Windows oriented keyboards, or the ◆ Meta keys used on Sun and other Unix keyboards, can be used in place of the Command keys. Conversely, when an Apple USB keyboard is used with other operating systems, the Command keys function as Windows keys or Meta keys.

On a Windows keyboard the position of the ⊞ Win and Alt keys are swapped compared to the position of Alt and ⌘ Command keys on an Apple keyboard. In macOS this can be configured in the keyboard preferences (Modifier Keys ...) so that the Windows Alt key (next to the space bar) becomes the Mac ⌘ Command key and vice versa so that users do not have to change their motor learning. All the modifier keys, along with the ⇪ Caps Lock, can be remapped to whichever modifier key function the user wishes, so users of traditional Unix style keyboards may choose to use the ⇪ Caps Lock key as a ⌘ Command key or other modifier.
