= Option key =

Modifier key present on Apple keyboards

⌥o

Option key
- In Unicode: U+2325 ⌥ OPTION KEY

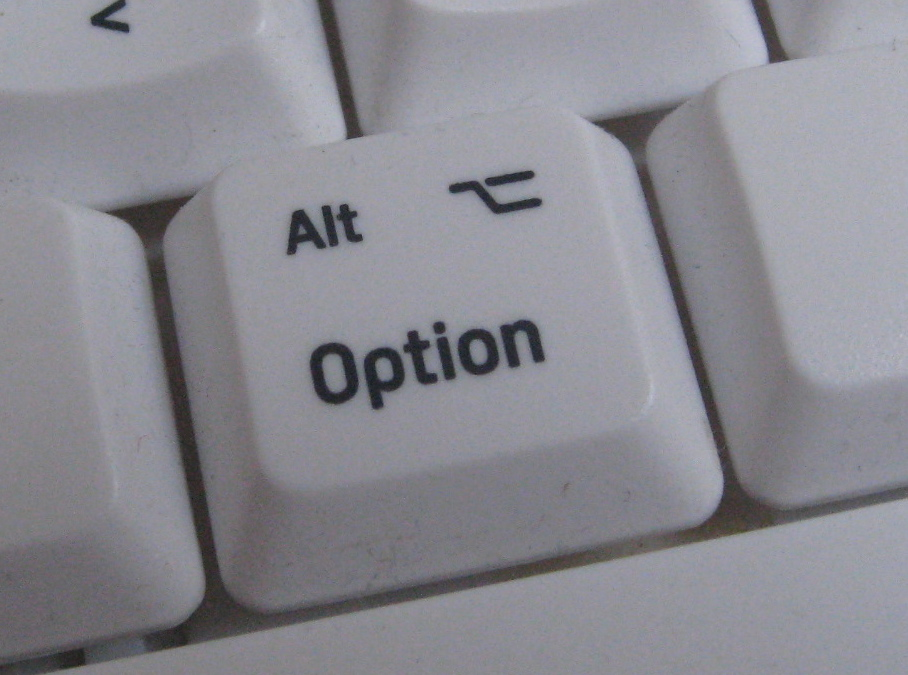
The Option key may be labeled Alt, Option, ⌥, or any combination thereof.

The Option key, ⌥, is a modifier key present on Apple keyboards. It is located between the Control key and the Command key on a typical Mac keyboard. There are two Option keys on modern (as of 2020) Mac desktop and notebook keyboards, one on each side of the space bar. (As of 2005, some laptops had only one, in order to make room for the arrow keys.)

Apple commonly uses the symbol U+2325 ⌥ OPTION KEY to represent the Option key. From 1980 to 1984, on the Apple II, this key was known as the closed apple key or the solid apple key, and had a black line drawing of a filled-in apple on it.

Since the 1990s, "Alt" has sometimes appeared on the key as well, for use as an Alt key with non-Mac software, such as Unix and Windows programs; as of 2017, the newest Apple keyboards such as the Magic Keyboard no longer include the "Alt" label. The Option key in a Mac operating system functions differently from the Alt key under other Unix-like systems or Microsoft Windows. It is not used to access menus or hotkeys but is instead used as a modifier for other command codes, as well as to provide easier access to various accents and symbols. In this regard, it is akin to the AltGr key, found on some IBM-compatible PC keyboards.

== Uses ==
=== Alternative keyboard input ===
The use of the Option key is similar to that of the AltGr key on European keyboards of IBM-compatible PCs, in the sense that it can be used to type additional characters, symbols and diacritical marks. The options available differ depending on the keyboard input locale that the user has selected. For example, in the U.S. English keyboard input, ⌥ Option+a produces the "å" character, and ⌥ Option+4 produces the cent sign "¢".

The Option key can also provide access to dead key functionality. For example, holding down ⌥ Option while pressing ` will create a highlighted grave accent which will be added to the next letter if possible – so if an e is then pressed, the resultant character is è. If an r is pressed instead, the two characters are not compatible so the result is `r.

The highlighted orange keys show the accents available from the combination of the ⌥ Option key and the keyboard characters e ` i n u. The accent then can be applied to associated letters both lower and uppercase. The additional characters a Mac will produce are a combination of both the ⌥ Option key and the ⇧ Shift key pressed down together. With this combination pressed the keyboard will now produce a different set or an uppercase version of the previous set in some cases.

Notice that holding the shift key as well as the option key while pressing a letter key may create "capital" versions of what results when the same letter key is pressed while the option key but not the shift key is held. For example:

- ⌥ Option+a results in å. ⌥ Option+⇧ Shift+a results in Å.
- ⌥ Option+c results in ç. ⌥ Option+⇧ Shift+c results in Ç.
- ⌥ Option+o results in ø. ⌥ Option+⇧ Shift+o results in Ø.
- ⌥ Option+' results in æ. ⌥ Option+⇧ Shift+' results in Æ.

The Option key is often used in conjunction with special keys like Tab ↹, delete, and return to provide alternate functions. For example, ⌥ Option+Return typically produces a line break that is not interpreted as a paragraph break.

=== Alternative buttons and menu items ===
The key is also used to provide for alternative menu items and buttons when pressed down. Examples:

- Safari, Finder – the Option key causes the "Close Window" menu item to switch to "Close All Windows" when pressed down. Consequently, clicking a window's close box with the option key depressed invokes "close all" as well. This functionality is a de facto Macintosh standard and available in numerous other programs.
- Dock – the Option key causes the "Hide" and "Quit" menu items in the context menu of a Dock icon to switch to "Hide Others" and "Force Quit".
- iTunes – the Create Playlist button switches to a Create Smart Playlist button. Holding Option and clicking the green Window Zoom (+) button at the top-left forces the iTunes window into fullscreen view, rather than switching between the user-set window size and the iTunes Mini Player.
- iPhoto – the rotate image button toggles between a "rotate right" and a "rotate left".
- Menu bar items – the Sound icon will show Audio Device input / output settings instead of the volume control slider, the battery item will show the condition of the battery, the MobileMe sync item will show the last sync date/time of individual synced items and will offer additional menu items such as Sync Diagnostics, and the Wireless icon will show extended wireless network information and, in Mac OS X Lion, offer an item for launching a Wi-Fi diagnostic application (when AirPort is connected). The apple menu can also be used in a similar manner, in which pressing and holding the option key while then clicking the apple menu can change certain options (About this Mac to System Information, as an example.

The iPhoto example is an example of a control whose behavior is governed by a preference, which is temporarily inverted by holding down the Option key. The preference in this case is which way to rotate the image: If the user changes the default rotation direction in the Preferences to clockwise, holding down Option will make the button rotate counterclockwise instead, and vice versa. It is common for such controls — that is, those whose behavior is governed by a preference — to be invertible in this way.

=== Common keyboard navigations ===
In text areas, the Option key can be used for quick keyboard navigation.

- ⌥ Option+←/→ – navigate to the previous/next word.
  - Windows equivalent: Ctrl+←/→
- ⌥ Option+↑/↓ – navigate to the head/end of current paragraph.
  - Terminal equivalent: ⇧ Shift+Home/End
  - Windows equivalent: Home/End
- ⌥ Option+Page up/Page down – navigate caret up/down a page. Without the Option key, the Page up/Page down keys let the page view scroll up/down a page without moving the caret.
  - Windows equivalent: Page up/Page down

=== Alternative mouse actions ===
When keeping the Option key pressed when using the mouse, the mouse action can change behaviour

- option-mouse clicking an application other than the current one, automatically hides the current application and switches to the clicked application.
- When dragging an item (file in the Finder, or layer in Adobe Photoshop, for instance), keeping Option pressed will Duplicate it instead of moving it.

=== File downloads ===
In browsers such as Safari and SeaMonkey, the option key can be used to download a file. Pressing down the option key when hitting return in the address bar causes the URL-specified file to be downloaded. Also, pressing the option key when clicking a hyperlink causes the link target to be downloaded. Besides the option key methods, other ways of downloading includes right-clicking (or ctrl (^) clicking, in Macs) a hyperlink to bring up a context menu, then selecting the appropriate download command, or pasting a URL directly into Safari's Downloads window.

=== Miscellaneous ===
Some applications make unique uses out of the option key:

- Terminal (including at least version 1.4.6 – no longer true as of 2.0.1, ⌘ Cmd+←/→ works.) – ⌥ Option+←/→ arrows navigates between open Terminal windows in a loop. Usually, programs use ⌘ Cmd+` and ⌘ Cmd+⇧ Shift+`, which are also supported for Terminal.
- Scroll bars (including at least OS X 10.3.x) – Option-clicking a scroll bar arrow can cause the view to jump to the next page instead of moving by a few lines. Option-clicking in the scroll bar can cause the view to jump to that position instead of jumping to the next page. This behavior can be reversed in System Preferences: Appearance.
- Startup Disk – Holding the Option Key at boot time activates a boot manager built into the firmware, where the user may choose from which drive/partition to boot the computer from, including Mac OS and Mac OS X partitions or drives on PowerPC-based Macs, and Mac OS X and Microsoft Windows partitions or drives on Intel-based Macs (running Mac OS X 10.4.6 and later with Boot Camp from Apple Inc. installed). This has been replaced by a general boot menu, activated by holding the power button on Apple Silicon-based Macs. The built-in bootloader can also boot other operating systems such as Linux; however, these are labeled as "Windows" in the bootloader.
