= Alt key =

Computer key

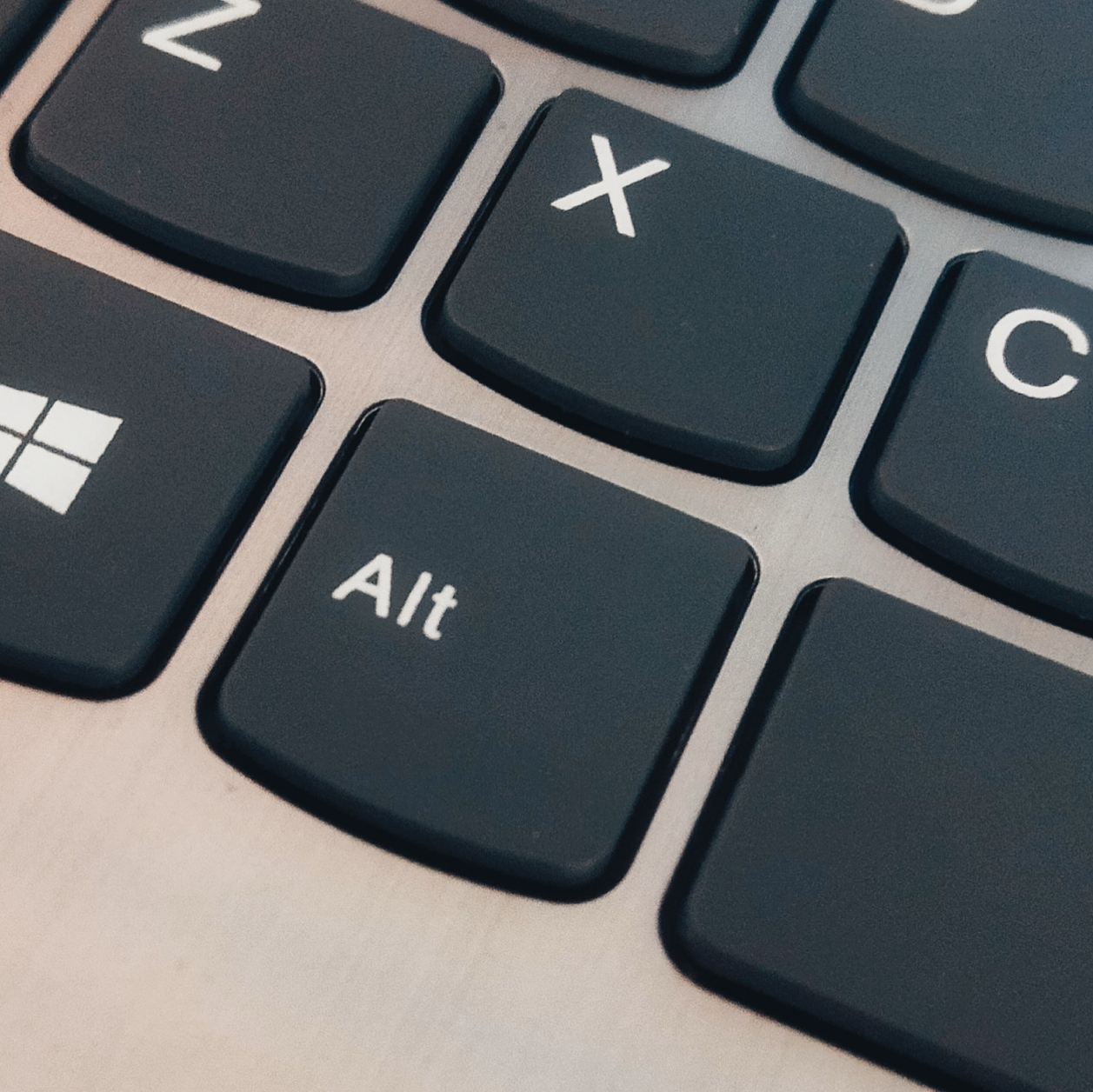
The Alt key on a Lenovo laptop keyboard

ISO keyboard symbol for “Alternate”

The Alt key Alt (pronounced /ɔːlt/ AWLT or /ʌlt/ ULT) on a computer keyboard is used to change (alternate) the function of other pressed keys. Thus, the Alt key is a modifier key, used in a similar fashion to the Shift key. For example, simply pressing A will type the letter 'a', but holding down the Alt key while pressing A will cause the computer to perform an Alt+A function, which can vary from program to program. The international standard ISO/IEC 9995-2 calls it the Alternate key. The key is located on either side of the space bar, but in non-US PC keyboard layouts, rather than a second Alt key, there is an 'Alt Gr' key to the right of the space bar. Both placements are in accordance with ISO/IEC 9995-2. With some keyboard mappings (such as US-International), the right Alt key can be reconfigured to function as an AltGr key although not engraved as such.

The standardized keyboard symbol for the Alt key, ⎇ (which may be used when the usual Latin lettering "Alt" is not preferred for labeling the key) is given in ISO/IEC 9995-7 as symbol 25, and in ISO 7000 "Graphical symbols for use on equipment" as symbol ISO-7000-2105. This symbol is encoded in Unicode as U+2387 ⎇ ALTERNATIVE KEY SYMBOL. Macintosh keyboards equate the Alt key with the ⌥ Option key, which has its own symbol, similar to that of the ISO standard.

The Alt key should not be confused with the Altmode key (sometimes also labelled Alt) on some Teletype and ASCII terminals, which is a synonym for the ASCII escape character.

== Evolution ==
The Alt key has come to replace the Meta key of the old MIT keyboards. In their original function, both Alt and Meta would set the high bit of the signal generated by the key to 1 (for example, A generates 01000001 while Alt+A generates 11000001). However, in modern software, due to the requirement for all bits to be used for post-ASCII 8-bit character sets, Alt no longer works in such a way.

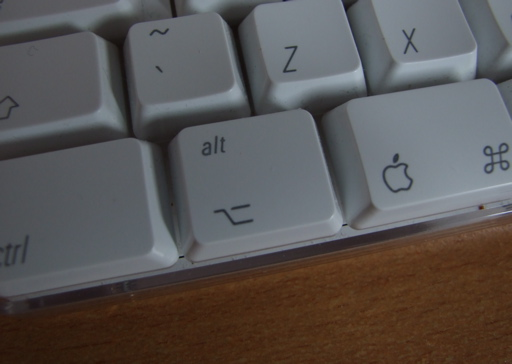
The Alt key on an Apple keyboard

Since the 1990s, Alt has been printed on the Option key (⌥ Opt) on most Mac keyboards. As of 2017, the newest Apple keyboards do not contain the Alt label. Alt is used in non-Mac software, such as non-macOS Unix and Windows programs, but in macOS it is always referred to as the Option key. The Option key's behaviour in macOS differs slightly from that of the Windows Alt key (it is used as a modifier rather than to access pull-down menus, for example).

== Alt key combinations ==
The Alt key is well known as part of various standard combinations:

- Ctrl+Alt+Delete may restart the computer (its original function); in some operating systems it brings up a task manager - see Control-Alt-Delete.
- Ctrl+Alt is treated as AltGr by Windows, although some software (such as Microsoft Outlook) do not accept this mapping.
- Alt+⌘ Cmd+Esc (often referred to as ⌘ Cmd+⌥ Opt+Esc.) brings up the Force Quit window in Apple's macOS, see Option key.
- Ctrl+Alt+← Backspace usually causes the X display server to shut down or to restart, see Control-Alt-Backspace.
- Alt+F4 closes the current window (or shuts down the computer if the desktop is in the foreground) on most windowing systems.
- Alt+⇧ Shift switches between language layouts.
- Alt+Tab ↹ switches between the currently opened windows on most windowing systems, often referred to as alt-tabbing.
- Alt+↵ Enter allows for a new line when ↵ Enter alone would perform another command. (This is also done by ⇧ Shift+↵ Enter in other programs.) For example, in a word processor, this creates a line break rather than a paragraph break.
- Holding Alt allows the selection of text within a hyperlink as if it were solid text. On Linux, this is done using Super+Alt. (The Linux "Super" key is physically the same as the Windows key.)
- When only holding Alt while dragging with the mouse on Linux (X Window System), the window is moved.

== Alt key for special characters ==
=== Windows ===
In Microsoft Windows, holding down the Alt key while typing in numbers (often referred to as Alt codes) on the numeric keypad allows the user to type special characters not normally available on the keyboard. For example, holding down Alt while typing 0225 (Alt+0225) on the numeric keypad will result in á, the character at 225 in the (Western Latin) code page 1252. These extended keyboard characters are useful for persons using foreign languages, mathematics, currency symbols, business use, etc. Some computers work the same if the Num Lock key is on.

=== macOS ===
On a Macintosh, the Alt key is called the Option key. It is not used to enter numeric character codes. Instead, keyboard letters and numbers are used. The diagram below shows the special characters a US Mac keyboard will produce when the Option key is pressed.

The highlighted orange keys show the accents available from the combination of the Alt key and the keyboard characters e i u (on the top letters row) and ` n (on the bottom letters row). The accent then can be applied to associated letters both lower and uppercase. The additional characters a Mac will produce are a combination of both the ⌥ Option key and the ⇧ Shift key pressed down together. With this combination pressed the keyboard will now produce a different set or an uppercase version of the previous set in some cases.

== Alt key pressed alone ==
When a user presses the Alt key by itself on Microsoft Windows, that moves keyboard focus to the menu bar of the application having keyboard focus, and the key is not delivered to the application. In that state, another press of the Alt key will be delivered to the application.

On other platforms, for example Ubuntu, the Alt key pressed by itself may invoke another application and not be delivered to the application having keyboard focus. In Ubuntu 16.04, pressing the key opens the HUD, which is an input field that lets the user perform menu commands such as opening a file, or creating a new file.

== See also ==
- Table of keyboard shortcuts
- Control-Alt-Delete
- Modifier key
- Alt code
- Option key
