= Mitsumi Electric =

Japanese manufacturer

Mitsumi Electric Co., Ltd.

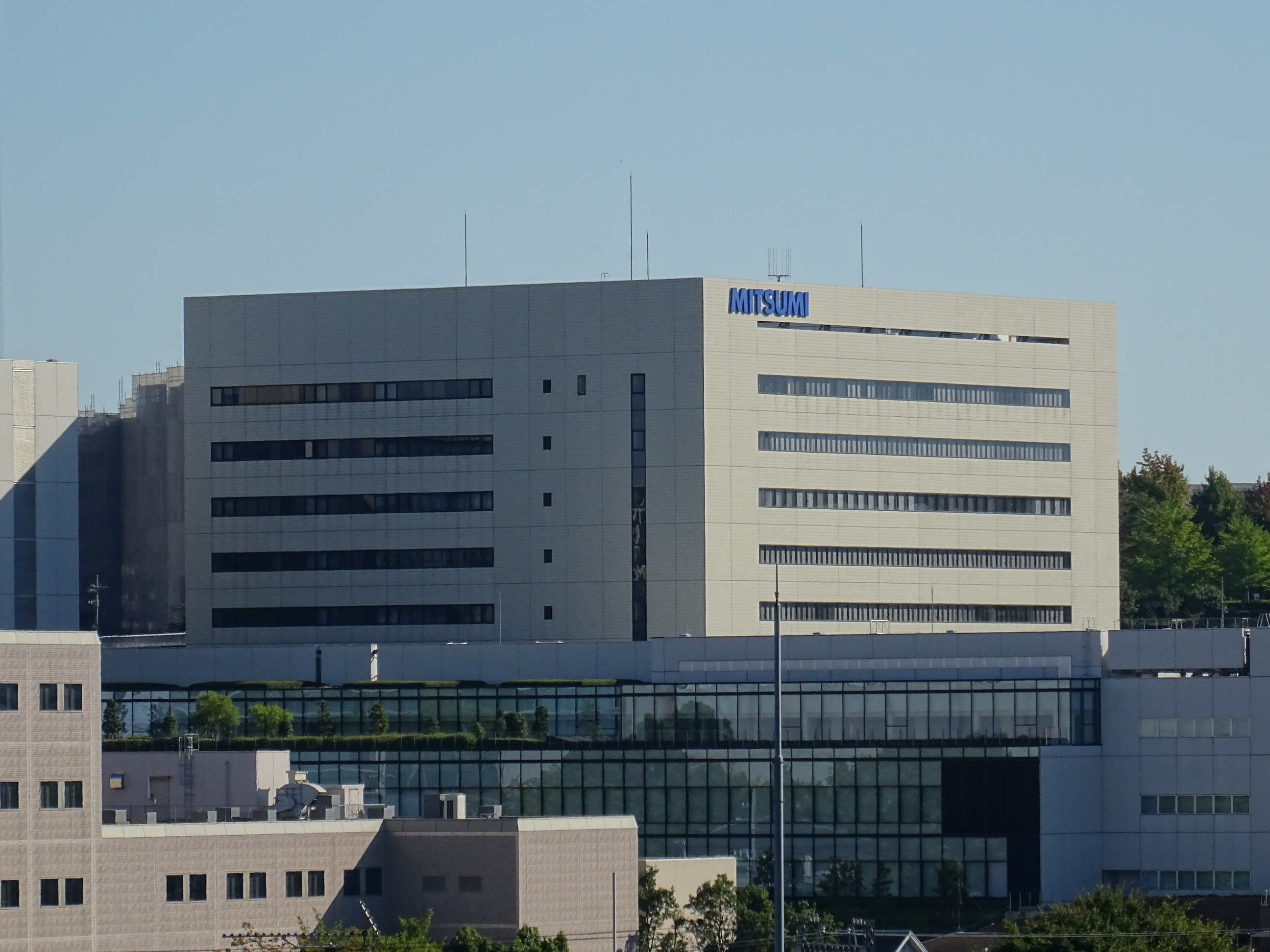
- Headquarters in Tama, Tokyo
- Native name: ミツミ電機株式会社
- Romanized name: Mitsumi Denki kabushiki gaisha
- Company type: Subsidiary KK
- Traded as: TYO: 6767; Nikkei 225 component
- Industry: Electronics
- Founded: January 1954; 72 years ago
- Headquarters: Tsurumaki, Tama, Tokyo, Japan
- Key people: Itsuo Moribe (Chairman); Shigeru Moribe (President and CEO)
- Products: ICs; Power supplies; Electronic components; Communications equipment
- Revenue: ▲JPY 157.3 billion (FY 2013) (US$ 1.54 billion) (FY 2013)
- Net income: ▲JPY 3.2 billion (FY 2014) (US$ 31.5 million) (FY 2014)
- Number of employees: 36,417 (consolidated, as of April 1, 2015)
- Parent: MinebeaMitsumi
- Website: Official website

Mitsumi Electric Co., Ltd. (ミツミ電機株式会社, Mitsumi Denki Kabushiki-gaisha) is a Japanese manufacturer of consumer electronic components, founded in 1954. Mitsumi has been a subsidiary of MinebeaMitsumi since 27 January 2017, when it merged with Minebea to form the parent company.

Mitsumi is primarily known as an OEM manufacturer of computer peripherals and input devices, floppy and optical disc drives used in laptop computers, desktops, servers and the Famicom Disk System. Prior to its merger with Minebea, the company was listed on the Tokyo Stock Exchange, was a constituent of the Nikkei 225 stock index and provided its products through its subsidiaries in Asia, Europe, and North America.

== Products ==
=== Video game console controllers ===
One of the company's most noticeable product lines were video game console controllers. Mitsumi manufactured the official controllers for the following consoles:

- Nintendo Entertainment System/Famicom controller
- Super Nintendo Entertainment System/Super Famicom controller
- GameCube controller (certain revisions only) and the WaveBird Wireless Controller
- Panasonic 3DO Controller
- Wii Remote and Wii Nunchuk (certain revisions only)
- PlayStation standard and DualShock controllers (certain revisions only)
- PlayStation 2 DualShock 2 controller (certain revisions only)
- Xbox original 'Duke' Controller and early 'Controller S' models

=== Other ===
Other products include:

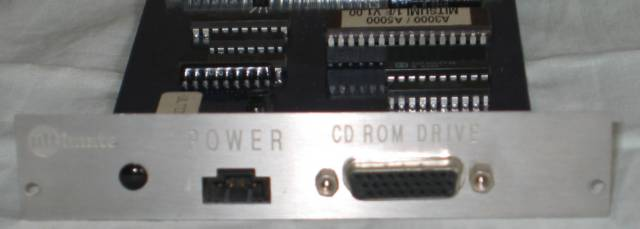
Mitsumi CD Interface. The HCCS Ultimate A5000 Mitsumi CD interface is an early CDROM interface for Acorn Computers.

- The Wi-Fi sub-PCB for the Nintendo DS family of systems (according to the FCC ID on the bottom of each system), and at least some of the Nintendo DS Lite consoles manufactured for Nintendo
- Nintendo DSi/3DS power adapter (WAP-002) and Sony Handycam power adapters (AC-L10A)
- Remote controls for several home electronics brands
- Computer keyboards, mice, and floppy drives for a number of computer manufacturers. These include the Apple Pro Keyboard and the Mighty Mouse, the keyboards, mice, and floppy drives for the Amiga, the keyboards for the VIC-20, TI-99/4A, and Amstrad CPC.
- Certain hardware parts for the Nintendo Wii U system
- Some components of the XM Satellite Radio system
