= High tech (disambiguation) =

High tech refers to "high technology". It may also refer to:

- High-tech architecture, an architectural style that emerged in the 1970s
- HiTech, a computer chess program
- Hi-Tech Automotive, a car builder and automotive design house
- Hi-Tech (G.I. Joe), a fictional character in the G.I. Joe universe
- Hi-Tech (DC Comics) an enemy of Superman in the DC Universe
- Health Information Technology for Economic and Clinical Health Act (HITECH Act)
- Hi-Tec, shoes and sportswear brand.

== See also ==
- High Tech Academy, an academy in Cleveland, Ohio, USA
- High Technology High School, a high school in Lincroft, New Jersey, USA
- Hi-Tek (disambiguation)
