= Hi-Tek (disambiguation) =

Hi-Tek is an American rapper and record producer.

Hi-Tek also refers to:

- Hi-Tek Corporation, a defunct American keyboard manufacturer
- DJ Hi-Tek, a member of Die Antwoord
- Hi-Tek (album), a 2001 studio album by American rapper Keak da Sneak

== See also ==
- Hi-Tek incident, a series of protests in Little Saigon, Orange County, California
- Hi-Tekk, a member of La Caution
- Hi-Tek 3, a project of Technotronic and Ya Kid K; see "Spin That Wheel"
- Hy-Tek Hurricane 103
