= Apple keyboards =

External computer keyboards developed by Apple Inc.

External Apple keyboards
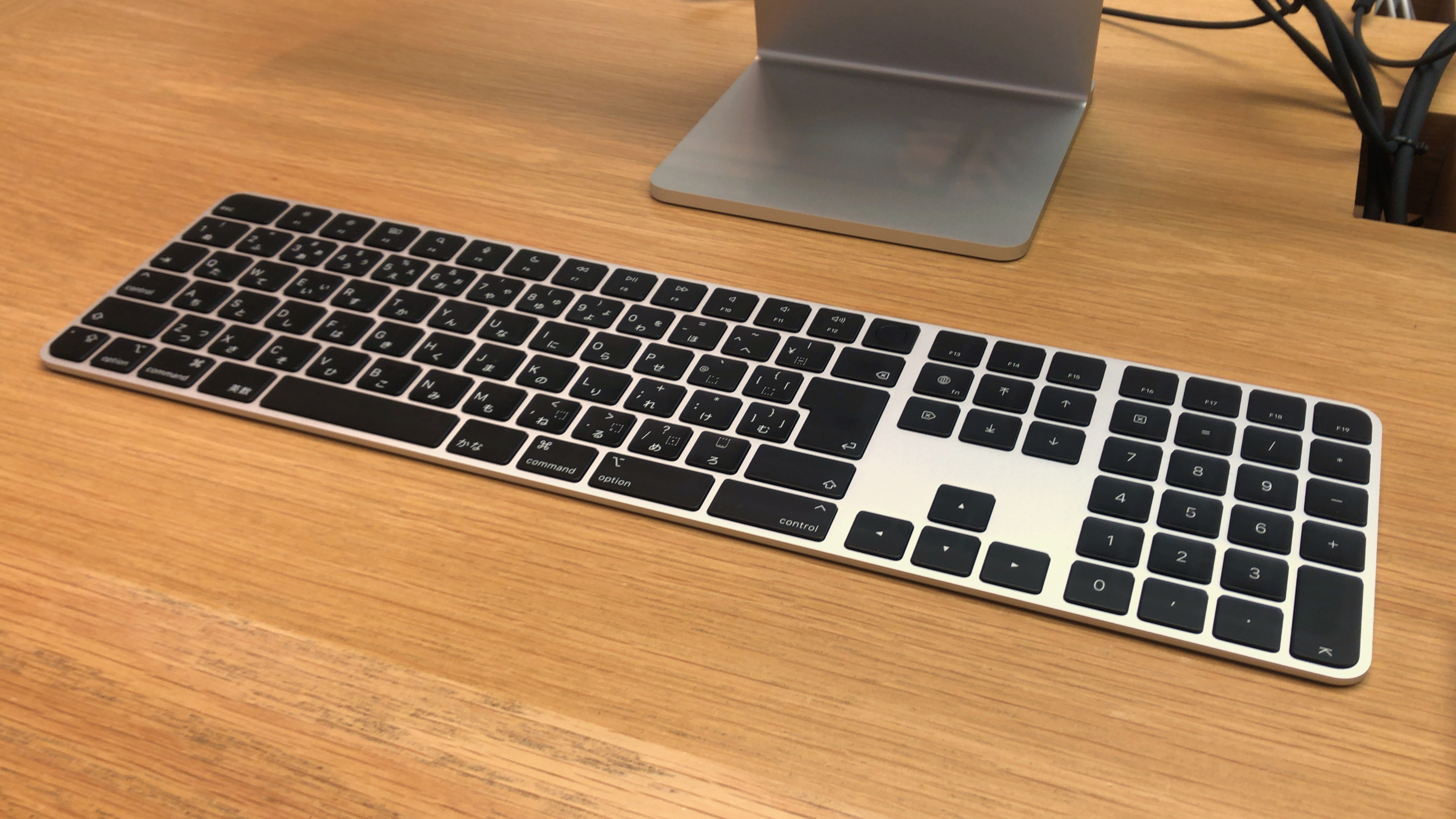
- A black Magic Keyboard with Touch ID and Numeric Keyboard
- Developer: Apple Inc.
- Type: Keyboard
- Website: Apple Mice & Keyboards

Apple Inc. has designed and developed many external keyboard models for use with families of Apple computers, such as the Apple II, Mac, and iPad. The Magic Keyboard and Magic Keyboard with Numeric Keypad are designed to be used via either Bluetooth and USB connectivity, and have integrated rechargeable batteries; The Smart Keyboard and Magic Keyboard accessories for iPads are designed to be directly attached to and powered by a host iPad. All current Apple keyboards utilize low-profile key designs, and common modifier keys.

As of 2015 the butterfly keyboard design was implemented with a complex polymer. In 2018 the MacBook keyboard was redesigned to contain a silicone membrane interior and keys made of nylon. In 2019 the scissor mechanism design was adopted to replace the butterfly design.

== Layout and features ==
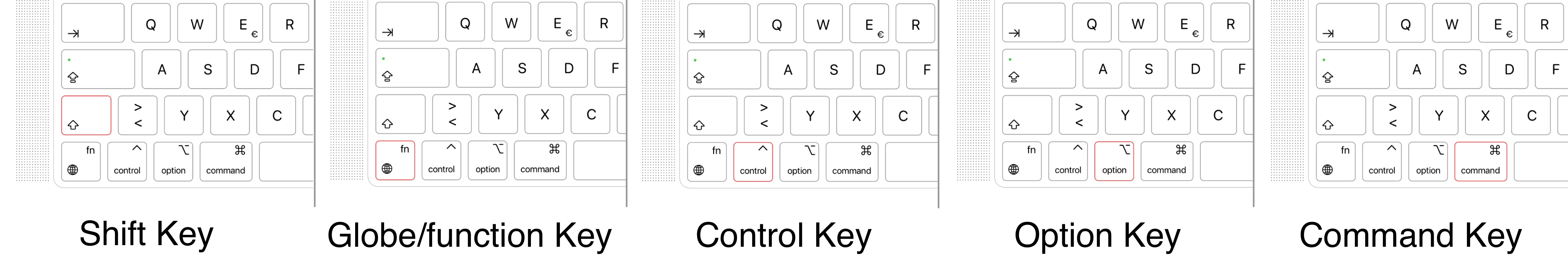
The modifier keys

To serve the functionality of the Macintosh operating systems (and because of historical differences), the Apple Keyboard's layout differs somewhat from that of the ubiquitous IBM PC keyboard, mainly in its modifier and special keys. Some of these keys have unique symbols defined in the Unicode block Miscellaneous Technical. Features different from other keyboards include:

- The Command key (⌘), used in most Mac keyboard shortcuts. The key functions as a Meta key or Super key in Unix-like environments, and is equally equivalent to the Windows key in Windows environments, although in common applications it performs the same function as the Windows Control key. Compared to their equivalents on the standard IBM PC keyboard layout the Command key and the Option key are located in reverse order.
  - The "open" (hollow) and separate "closed" (solid) Apple logo keys on the Apple II series, served functions similar to that of the Command key. The open-Apple key was combined with the Command key on Apple Desktop Bus keyboards (which were used on both the Apple IIgs and several years of Macintosh models) where it remained after the Apple II line was discontinued.
- The Option key (⌥), for entering diacritics and other special characters. Like the Shift and Control keys, the Option key serves as a modifier for the Command key shortcuts, as well as being used to type many special characters. It serves the function of the solid-Apple key in Apple II applications. It functions as the Alt key in Unix and Windows environments. Compared to their equivalents on the standard IBM PC keyboard layout the Command key and the Option key are located in reverse order.
- Full-sized desktop keyboards with a dedicated numpad have function keys that can range up to F15, F16, or F19. F17-F19 keys were introduced with the aluminium USB keyboard. The function keys on all compact Magic Keyboards and MacBooks range from F1-F12 only, just like IBM PC keyboards.
- A Clear key, instead of a Num Lock key, on models with full numeric keypads, as these are dedicated to numeric input and not generally used for cursor control. In Unicode, the Clear key is represented by U+2327 ⌧ X IN A RECTANGLE BOX, defined as "clear key".
- An "equals" key (=) added to the numeric keypad.
- A Help key, instead of an Insert key, or on the most recent aluminum keyboards, a fn key, which toggles the function of the function keys between their default functions and special functions (volume control, Exposé, etc.).
- Notebook computers typically include additional assignments shared with function keys: reduce and increase brightness, volume up, volume down, mute, and eject (⏏). Apple, since the release of the Pro Keyboard, provides these last four keys on desktop keyboards above the numeric keypad where status indicator lights are on many IBM PC keyboards. On the newest aluminum keyboard, these functions are accessed with the function keys, just like on the Apple laptops.
- On Apple Desktop Bus keyboards, a power key (◁), used to turn on computers that supported it (and to type the Mac three-finger salute). On keyboards with function keys, it was placed either on the left or right edge of the same keyboard row as the function keys; on keyboards without function keys it was placed in a central location above the other keys. The power key was replaced with a more conventional power button on early USB keyboards, thanks to a proprietary pin wired to the Macintosh's power supply in Apple's early USB implementations, subsequently eliminated on the Pro Keyboard along with the special power supply pin. Most of its functions were transferred to the eject (⏏) key in such later keyboards (holding down the control key simultaneously to make the eject key act like the power key).
  - On the Apple IIGS, this key, used in conjunction with the control key, is reset. Used in conjunction with the open Apple key, reset reboots the computer. Various other reset key combinations do various other things.
- The Apple UK keyboard layout has the @ and " keys in their US locations (on the 2 and ' keys respectively). These are normally reversed on non-Apple UK keyboards.

=== Image of US keyboard layout ===
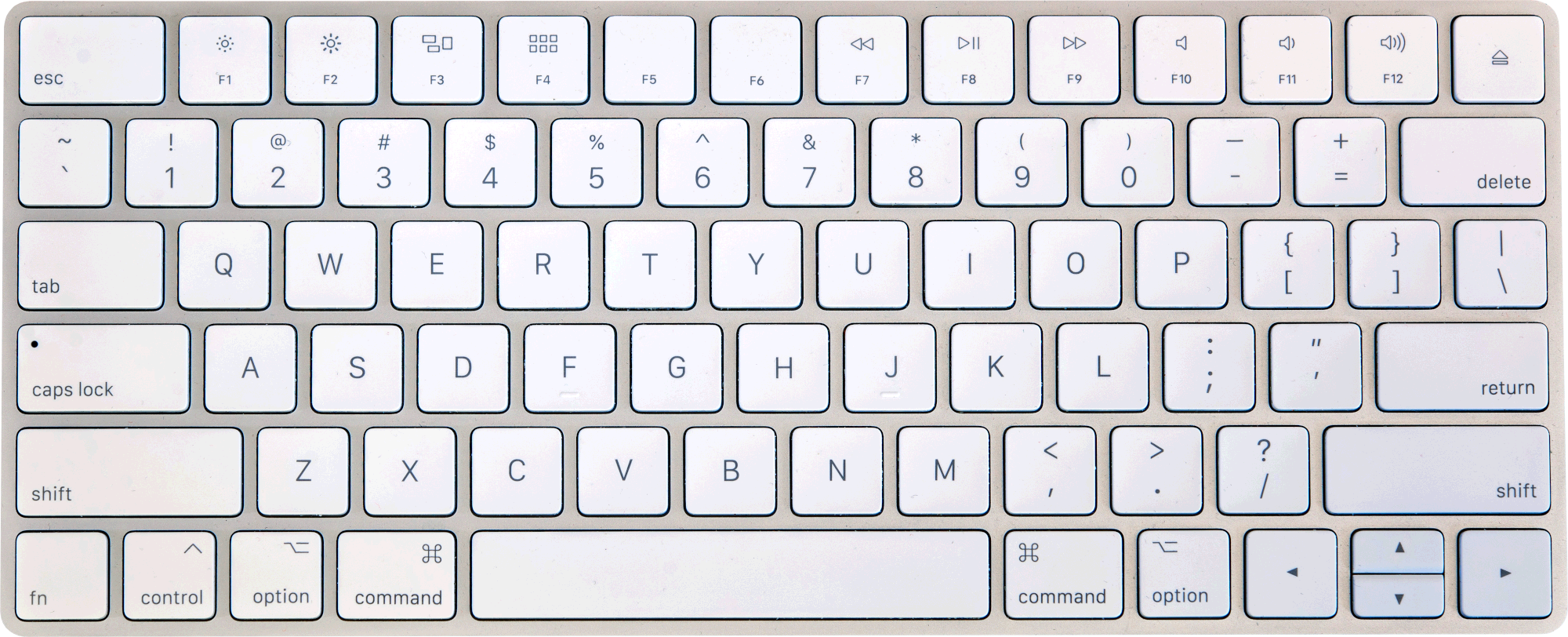

=== Function key assignments ===
	F1	F2	F3	F4	F5	F6	F7	F8	F9	F10	F11	F12
(2003–2007)	🔅 Brightness down	🔆 Brightness up	🔇 Mute	🔉 Volume down	🔊 Volume up	Num Lock	Display switch		All windows (Exposé)	Application windows (Exposé)	Show desktop (Exposé)	Dashboard
(2007–2011)	🔅 Brightness down	🔆 Brightness up	Exposé	Dashboard			⏪️ Rewind	⏯️ Play/ pause	⏩️ Fast forward	🔇 Mute	🔉 Volume down	🔊 Volume up
MacBook Air (2010)	🔅 Brightness down	🔆 Brightness up	Exposé	Dashboard		⏪️ Rewind	⏯️ Play/ pause	⏩️ Fast forward	🔇 Mute	🔉 Volume down	🔊 Volume up	⏏️ Eject
(2011–2020)	🔅 Brightness down	🔆 Brightness up	Mission Control	Launchpad	Keyboard backlight down	Keyboard backlight up	⏪️ Rewind	⏯️ Play/ pause	⏩️ Fast forward	🔇 Mute	🔉 Volume down	🔊 Volume up
(2020–present)	🔅 Brightness down	🔆 Brightness up	Mission Control	🔎 Spotlight	🎙️ Dictation	🌙 Do not disturb (Big Sur); Focus (starting from Monterey)	⏪️ Rewind	⏯️ Play/ pause	⏩️ Fast forward	🔇 Mute	🔉 Volume down	🔊 Volume up

== Current keyboards ==
=== Magic Keyboard (2021) ===
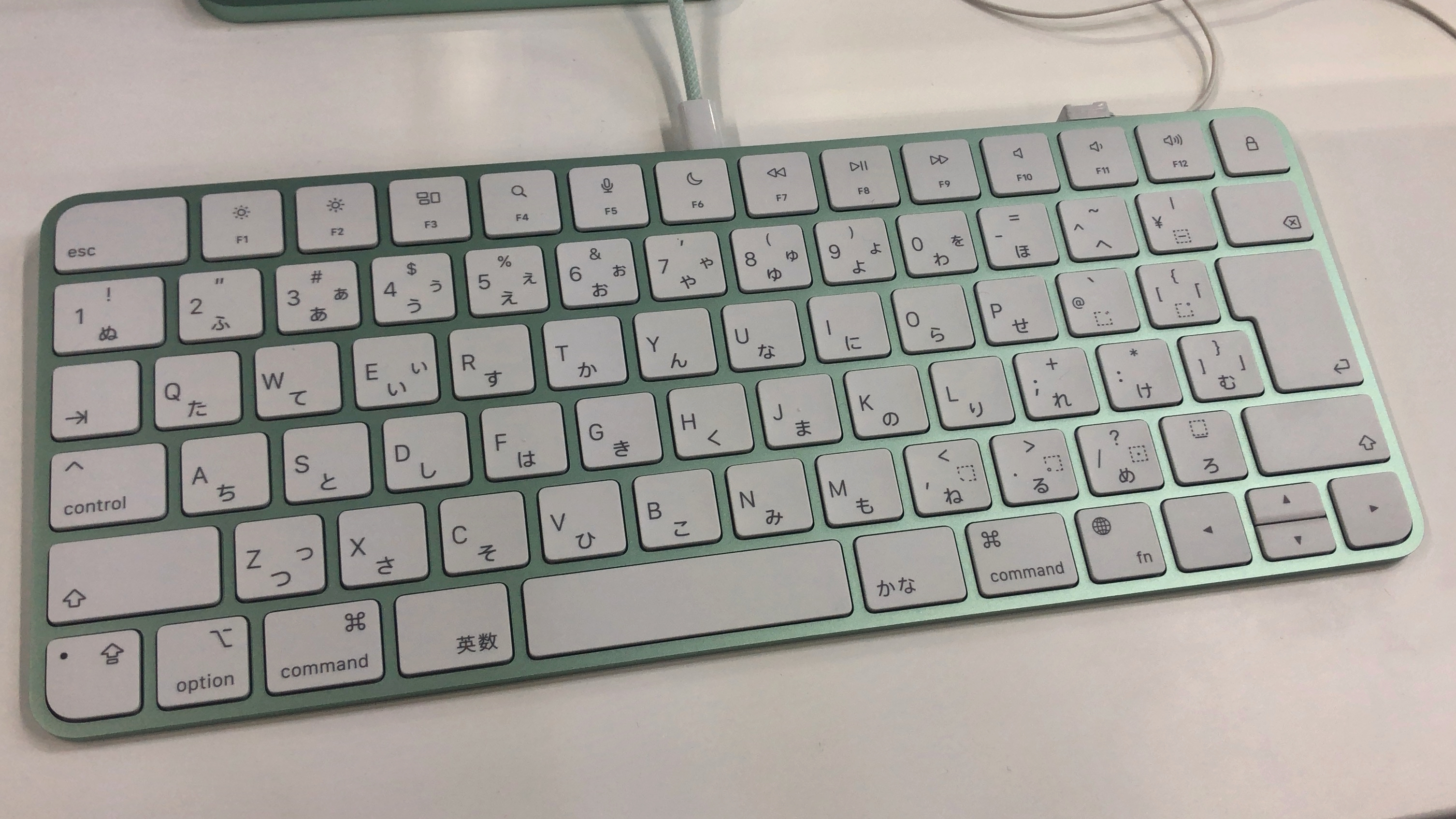
A green Magic Keyboard (A2450), bundled with the green M1 iMac

The Magic Keyboard is Apple's current design of external keyboards designed for use with Mac computers. It can use either wireless Bluetooth connectivity, or a wired connection via a USB to Lightning cable. It utilizes scissor-switch key mechanisms, and comes in several layouts and colors, including the option of a Numeric Keypad, Touch ID fingerprint authentication, and colors to match each color variant of the M1 iMac.

- A2449 Magic Keyboard with Touch ID: 77 keys
  - May 2021: Bundled / optional upgrade with M1 iMac in any of seven colors: silver, pink, blue, green, purple, orange, or yellow
  - August 2021: Standalone ($149) (MK293LL/A EMC 3579): Silver
- A2450 Magic Keyboard: 78 keys
  - May 2021 (MK2A3LL/A $99 EMC 3619); Silver
- A2520 Magic Keyboard with Touch ID and Numeric Keypad: 109 keys
  - May 2021: Bundled with M1 iMac in any of seven colors: silver, pink, blue, green, purple, orange, or yellow
  - August 2021: Standalone (MK2C3LL/A: Silver with white keys $179 EMC 3957)
  - August 2021: Standalone (MMMR3LL/A: Silver with black keys $199; EMC 3957)

=== Magic Keyboard for iPad ===
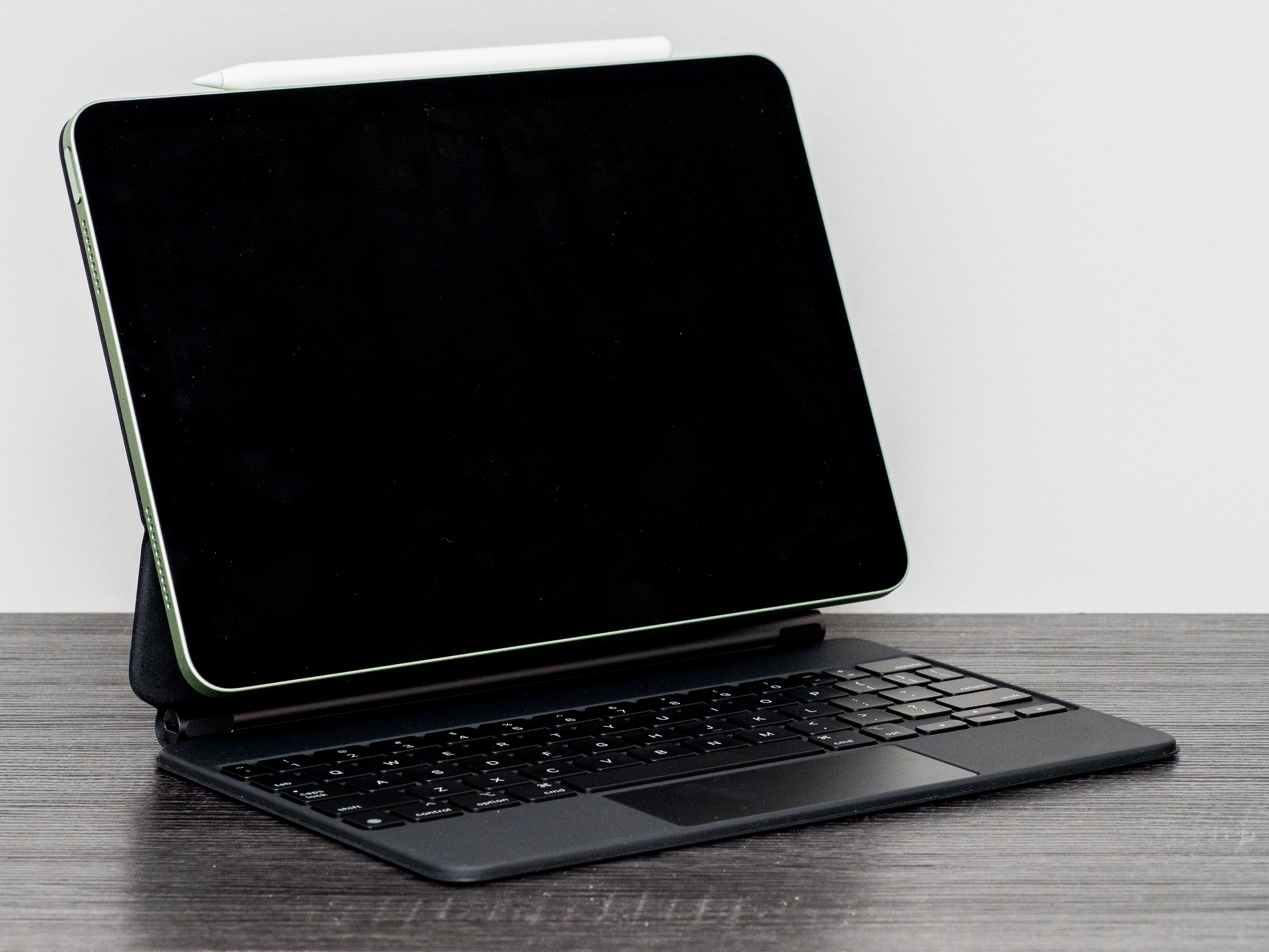
iPad Air (4th generation) on a black Magic Keyboard

On March 18, 2020, the Magic Keyboard was announced alongside the introduction of mouse cursor support for iPadOS 13, and includes a trackpad and front-and-back protection, as a more capable alternative to the Smart Keyboard. Like the Smart Keyboard, it uses the Smart Connector to draw power, and also comes with a USB-C port for pass-through charging of the iPad Pro. Its keys are backlit and use a scissor-switch mechanism. It attaches magnetically to the iPad Pro or iPad Air, which sits above a cantilever that allows adjusting the viewing angle.

Several revisions of the Magic Keyboard have been released, in black and white colors, and are compatible with 11 in (280 mm) and 12.9 in (330 mm) iPad Pro models from 2018 and later, and 10.9 in (280 mm) iPad Air models from 2020 and later. A version for the entry-level iPad model, called the Magic Keyboard Folio, was released for the iPad (10th generation). This version relies on a two-piece mechanism with separate kickstand and keyboard components to attach to the iPad, instead of a single piece with a cantilever. The Magic Keyboard Folio also features a 14-key function row.

A second-generation thinner Magic Keyboard for iPad Pro (M4) was introduced on May 7, 2024, with general availability on May 15, 2024. It features the larger trackpad with haptic feedback and the 14-key function row previously used on the Magic Keyboard Folio. The second-generation Magic Keyboard design was later brought to the iPad Air (M3) on March 4, 2025, but without trackpad haptic feedback, a keyboard backlight, or an aluminum case.

== Discontinued keyboards ==
=== Numeric Keypad II ===
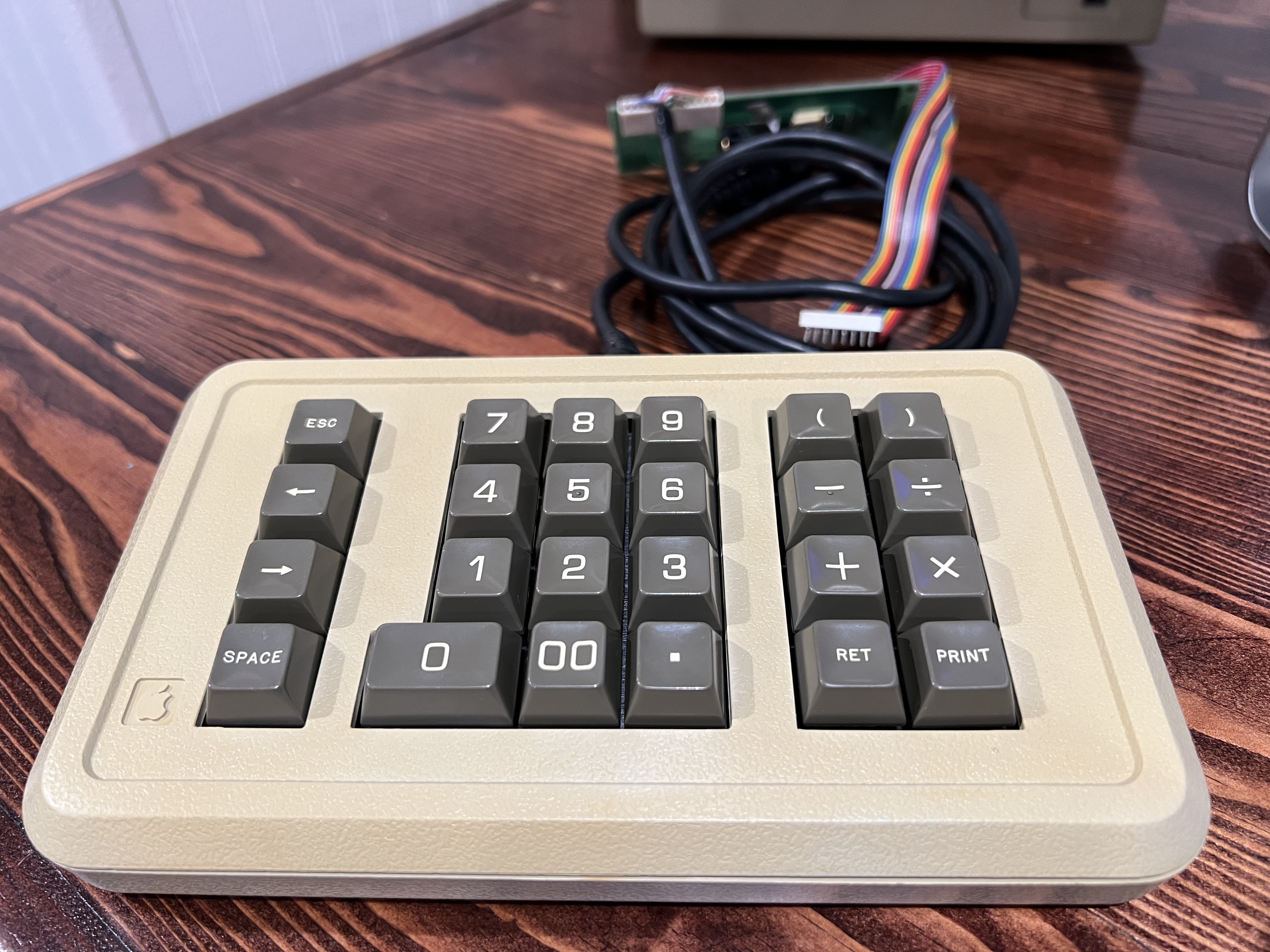
Apple Numeric Keypad II

The Numeric Keypad II (model A2M0056) was Apple's first external keypad. It was originally created by Michael Muller at The Keyboard Company in 1977 at the request of Steve Jobs for the Apple II. In 1980, Apple purchased The Keyboard Company and became the Accessory Products Division.

A revised version Numeric Keypad IIe (model A2M2003) was released in 1982 with changes to match the aesthetics of the Apple IIe. The Platinum IIe, introduced in January 1987, incorporated the numeric keypad into its built-in keyboard.

=== Lisa Keyboard ===
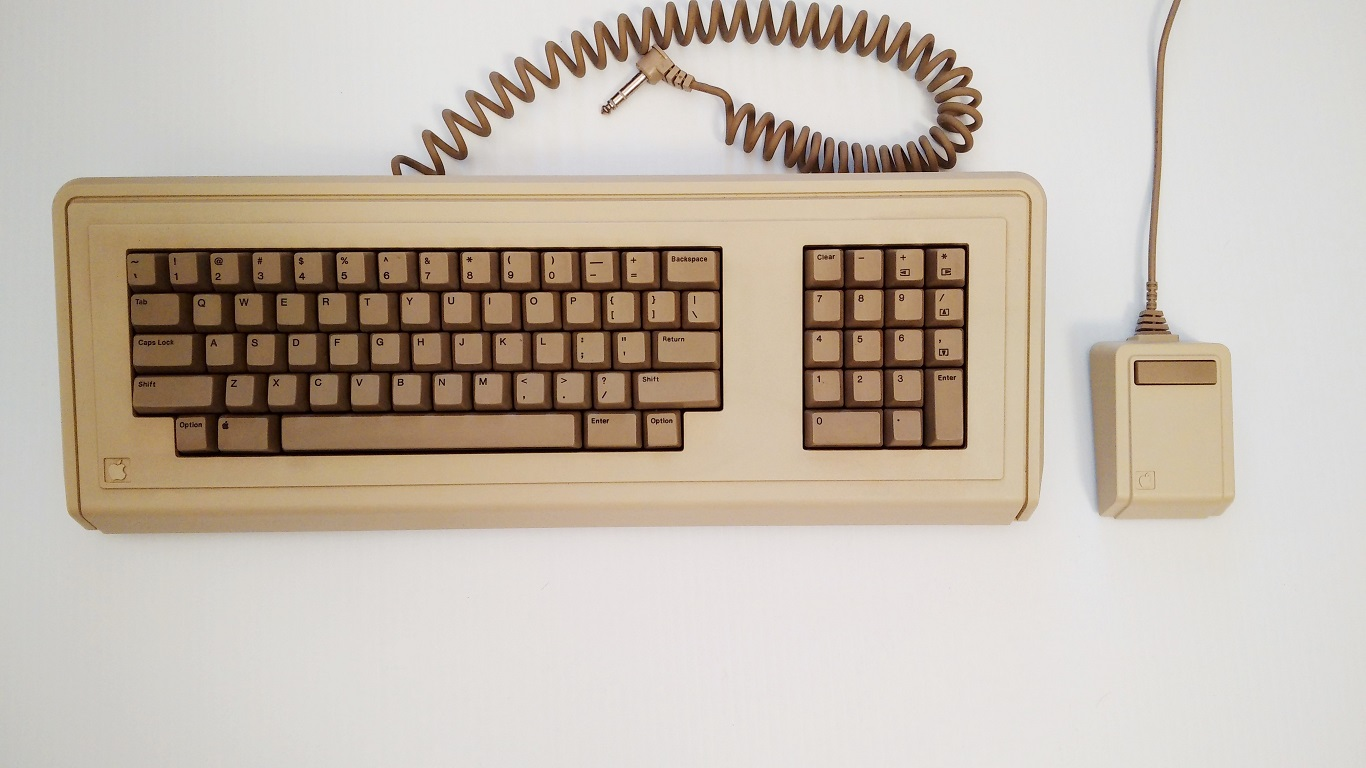
Lisa Keyboard with Lisa Mouse

The Lisa Keyboard (model A6MB101) was designed for and came with the Apple Lisa. It was the first keyboard not to be integrated into the case like the Apple II and III series before it. Like the Apple III, it was intended to be a business computer and included an integrated numeric keypad. Like all Apple computers before it, it came in a beige case to match the Lisa and connected by a unique TRS connector. In addition it carried over the use of the "open" Apple key from the Apple III as a command key (though it was represented by the "closed" Apple character) and included a pullout reference guide hidden under the keyboard.

=== Macintosh Keyboard ===
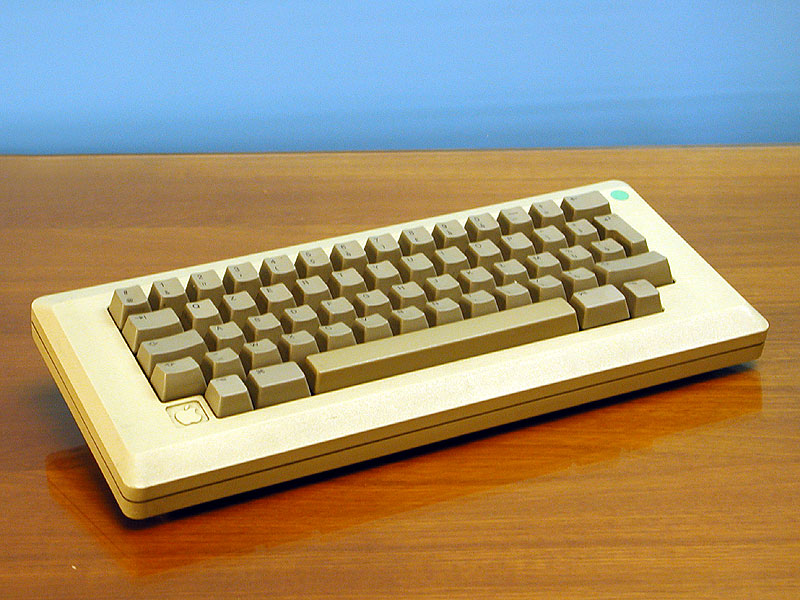
An ISO-layout Macintosh Keyboard

The Macintosh Keyboard (model M0110) was introduced with the original Macintosh in 1984. It lacked arrow keys, a numeric keypad and function keys. Apple intended this design to encourage developers to create software for the Macintosh's graphical user interface rather than port applications from older platforms.

The keyboard connected to a port on the front of the computer using a RJ11 telephone cord-style connector and a coiled cable. However, the cable's wiring differed from that of a standard telephone handset cord, making the latter unsuitable as a replacement, and can result in damage to the keyboard or the computer.

The keyboard was the first to include the command key and its looped-square symbol (⌘).

=== Macintosh Numeric Keypad ===
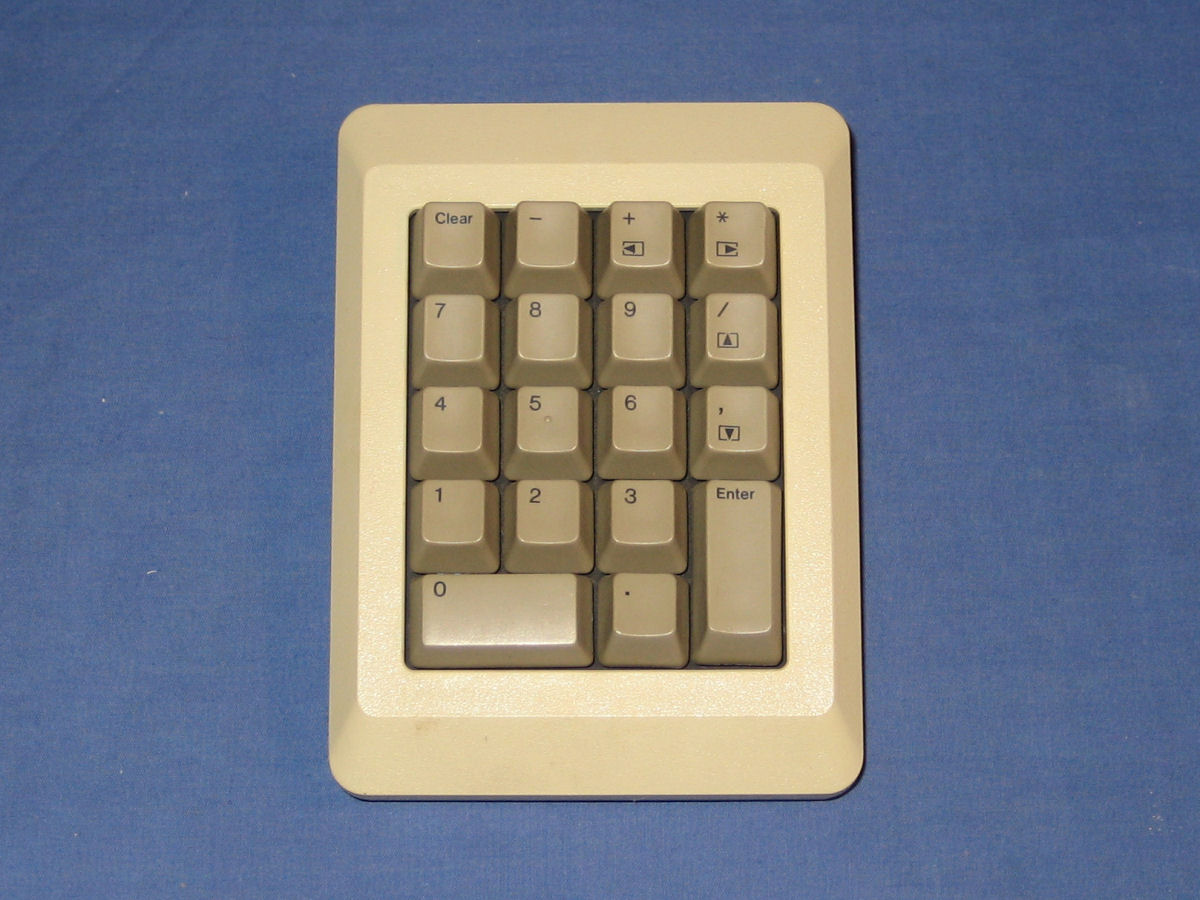
Macintosh Numeric Keypad

The Macintosh Numeric Keypad (model M0120) was an optional accessory for the original Macintosh. Though introduced in January 1984, Apple did not ship the keypad until September 1984 at a retail price of US$99 (equivalent to $310 in 2025). The M0120P version used symbols on the Clear and Enter keys instead of the text labels found on the M0120.

=== Macintosh Plus Keyboard ===
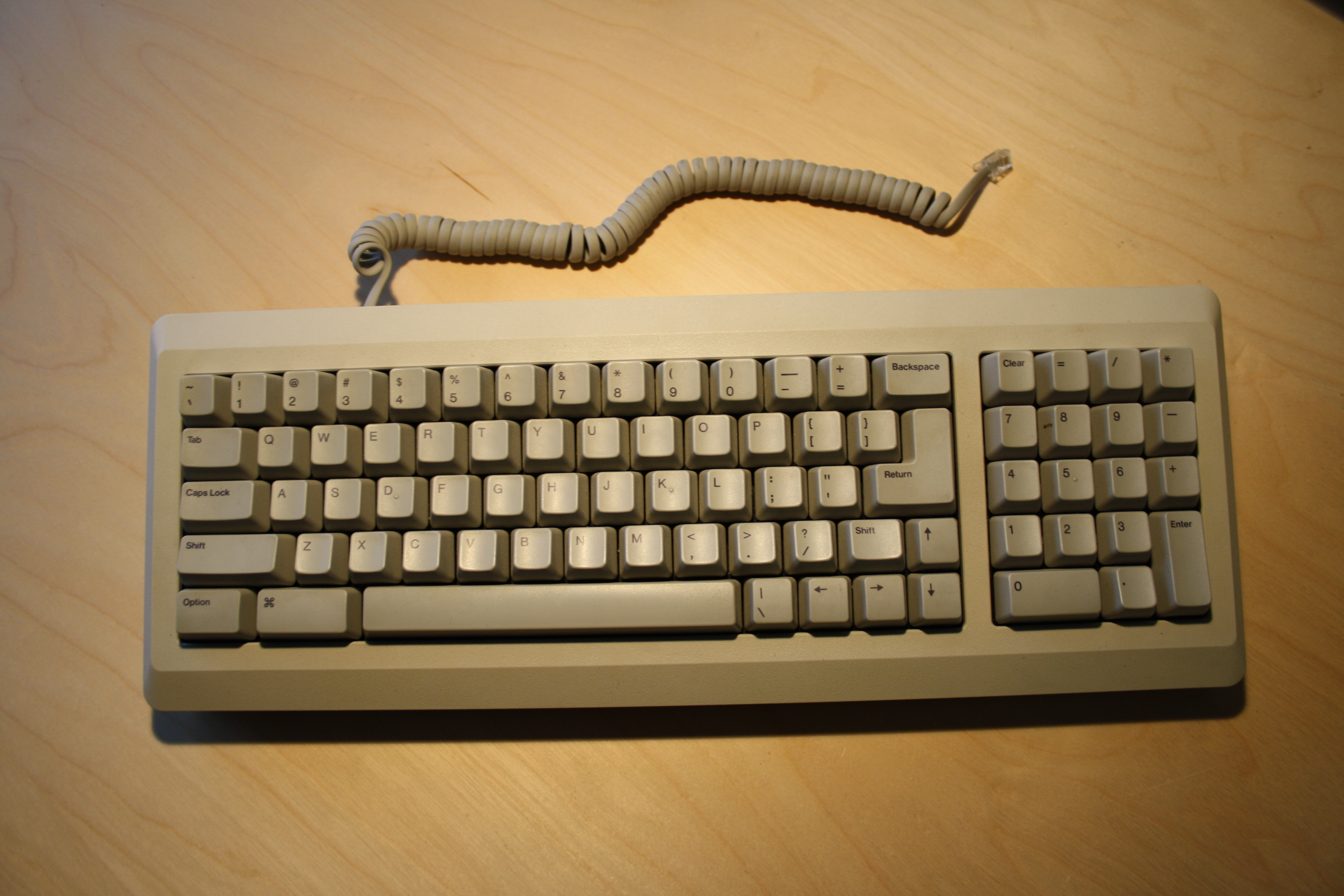
Macintosh Plus Keyboard

The Macintosh Plus Keyboard (model M0110A) was introduced and included with the Macintosh Plus in 1986, it was an extended keyboard that had a built-in numeric keypad. In 1987 it was updated to Apple's new Platinum gray color. It continued to use the telephone-cord style connector to the system and was interchangeable with the M0110. Though Apple switched all other keyboards to Apple Desktop Bus connectors by this time, this keyboard was manufactured unchanged for four more years until the Plus was discontinued in 1990.

=== Apple Desktop Bus Keyboard ===
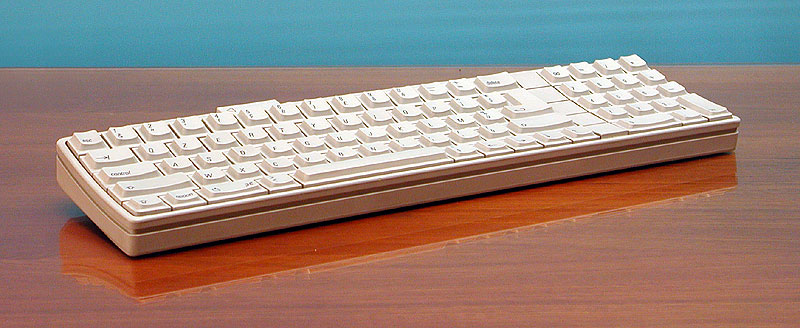
Apple Desktop Bus Keyboard

The Apple Desktop Bus Keyboard (model A9M0330) was the first Apple keyboard to use the new Apple Desktop Bus (ADB) connector first seen on the Apple IIGS. Designed to be compatible with both the Macintosh and Apple product lines, it was the first to combine both the Macintosh command key and Apple II "open" Apple key legends. It was also the first Macintosh-compatible keyboard from Apple to have either an Escape key or a Control key, both already present on Apple II keyboards. (Note: Note that the cited excerpt from the Guide to the Macintosh® Family Hardware does not make mention of this keyboard (the A9M0330): the Guide only discusses the M0115 and M0116 keyboards and doesn't discuss the A9M0330 anywhere, presumably because it was not officially a Macintosh product. However the A9M0330 is compatible with ADB Macintoshes and predates the M0115 and M0116, so the Guide 's observations that the M0115 and M0116 introduce Esc and Control to the Mac also apply to the A9M0330.)

Entirely Platinum gray in color (later Macintosh Plus keyboards had a platinum gray case with darker gray keys called "Smoke"), it was also the first to use Snow White design language that was similar to the Apple IIc. However, it duplicated the extended design established by the Plus. It was also the first to include an external power/reset button and an extra ADB port.

=== Apple Keyboard ===
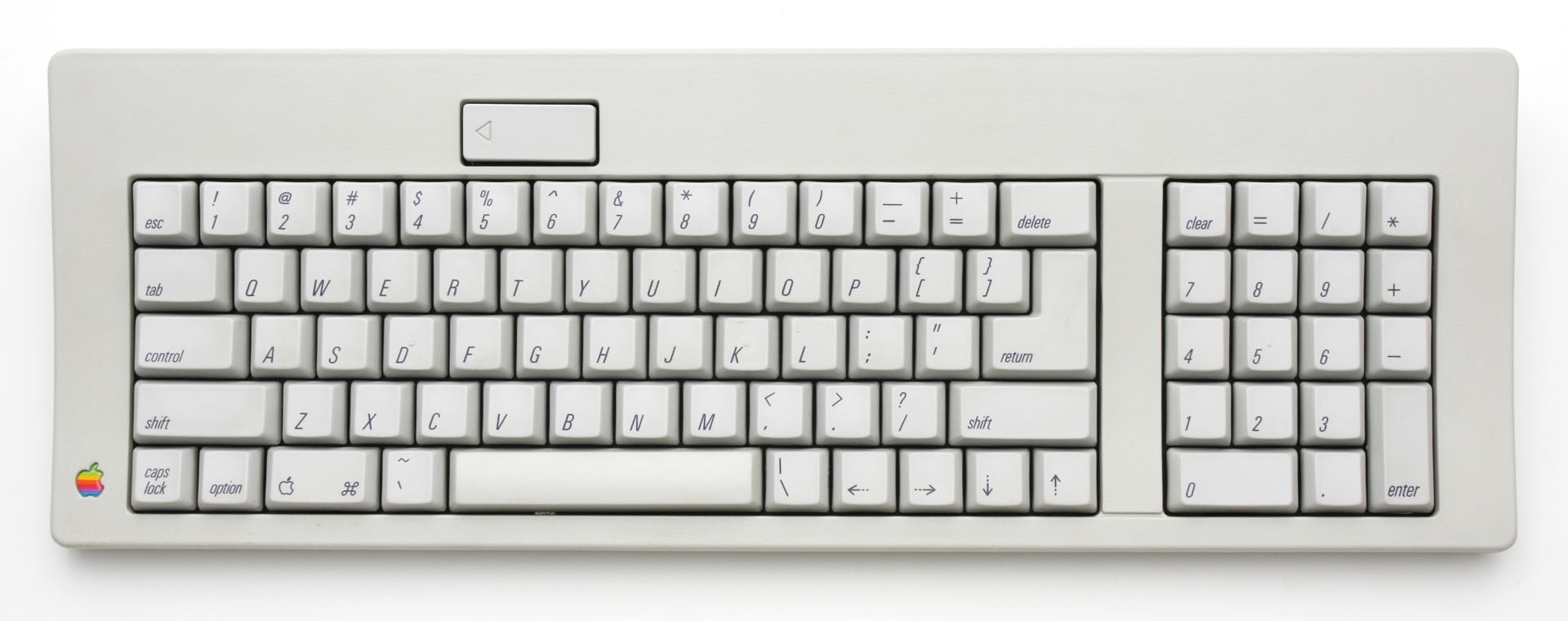
Apple Keyboard

The Apple Keyboard (model M0116), also known as the Apple Standard Keyboard, it was the first to officially use this name. Apple would later reuse the name for a series of successive keyboards. The Apple Keyboard was a more solid version of the Apple Desktop Bus Keyboard and optionally included with the Macintosh II and SE in 1987. (This shared layout with the A9M0330 meant that it retained the Escape and Control keys introduced by that keyboard, as did the M0115 Apple Extended Keyboard and subsequent Macintosh keyboards.)

The heftier design solidified visually the power performance embodied by the upgraded Macs. Aside from weight the main difference was the significantly thicker frame width. It was the first keyboard to be sold separately from the system, giving the customer a choice of the basic or advanced keyboards offered by Apple.

=== Apple Extended Keyboard ===
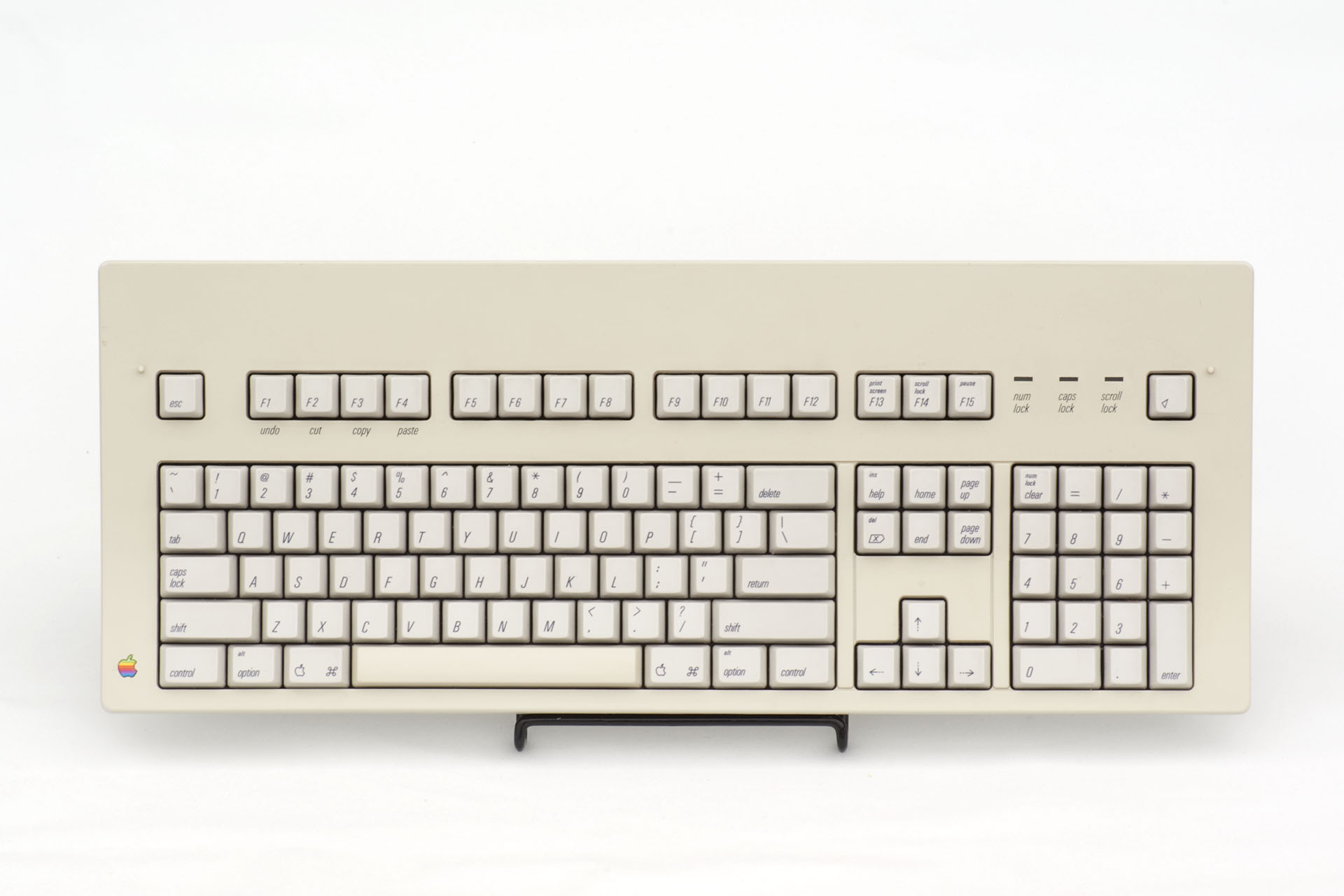
Apple Extended Keyboard

The Apple Extended Keyboard (model M0115) was released in 1987. It was the first Apple keyboard to be based on the keyset and layout of IBM's Enhanced Keyboard models, in particular the "101 key ANSI" layout. IBM Enhanced (or "Model M") boards had begun to be shipped with IBM PCs in 1986.

New additions include the function keys (including the nav cluster of six keys to the left of the number pad), all laid out in the style of the IBM Enhanced Keyboards. (Also copied is the inverted-T cursor layout, making its first appearance on an Apple keyboard.) In other respects the design is a variation of that of the Apple (Standard) Keyboard. According to Apple the Extended Keyboard, $100 more expensive than the Standard Keyboard alternative at launch, was meant for use with non-Macintosh operating systems or with programs or "data communications packages" ported from other computers which used function keys.

One divergence affected the modifier keys: the Extended Keyboard has three modifier keys (Control, Alt and Command), mirrored on each side of the spacebar, rather than the two of contemporary Model Ms. This actually anticipates the 104-key variation of IBM's layout, which did not become established on Windows PCs until the introduction of the Windows key in 1994. (Macintosh programs could distinguish right from left Control and Option modifiers if desired, introducing right-modifier inputs to the Mac for the first time.)

=== Apple Keyboard II ===
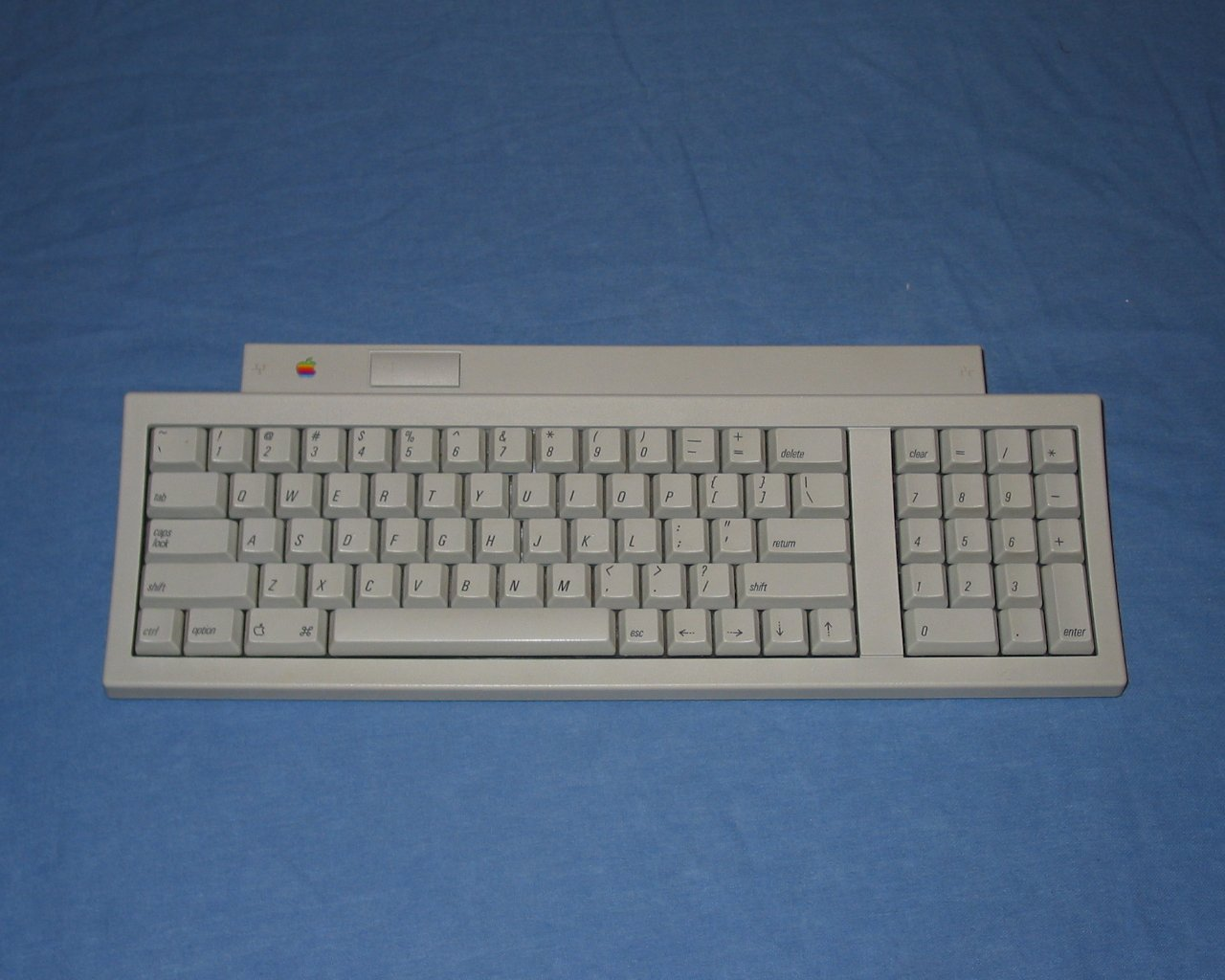
Apple Keyboard II

The Apple Keyboard II (model M0487) was introduced in 1990 and bundled with the Macintosh Classic and Macintosh LC, the Apple Keyboard II (M0487) marked Apple's return to including a keyboard with its computers as standard equipment. It closely resembled the original Apple Desktop Bus Keyboard, but added flip-down feet to adjust the typing angle and a revised case and key design. Unlike the original Apple Keyboard, the Apple Keyboard II did not use mechanical key switches, except for the Caps Lock key.

In 1993, the Macintosh TV, the first Mac introduced in all black, came with an matching black Apple Keyboard II (using the same model number).

=== Apple Extended Keyboard II ===
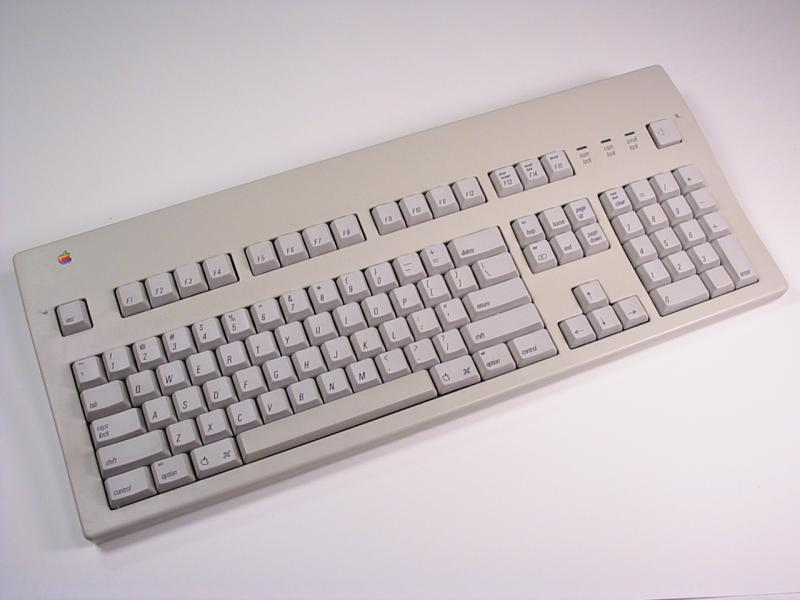
Apple Extended Keyboard II

The Apple Extended Keyboard II (model M0312 and M3501) was a minor update to the Apple Extended Keyboard to coincide with the release of the Macintosh IIsi in 1990, it added an adjustable height feature. Model M0312 was manufactured with the classic Alps mechanisms, while model M3501 was manufactured with Mitsumi or Alps mechanisms.

=== Apple Adjustable Keyboard ===
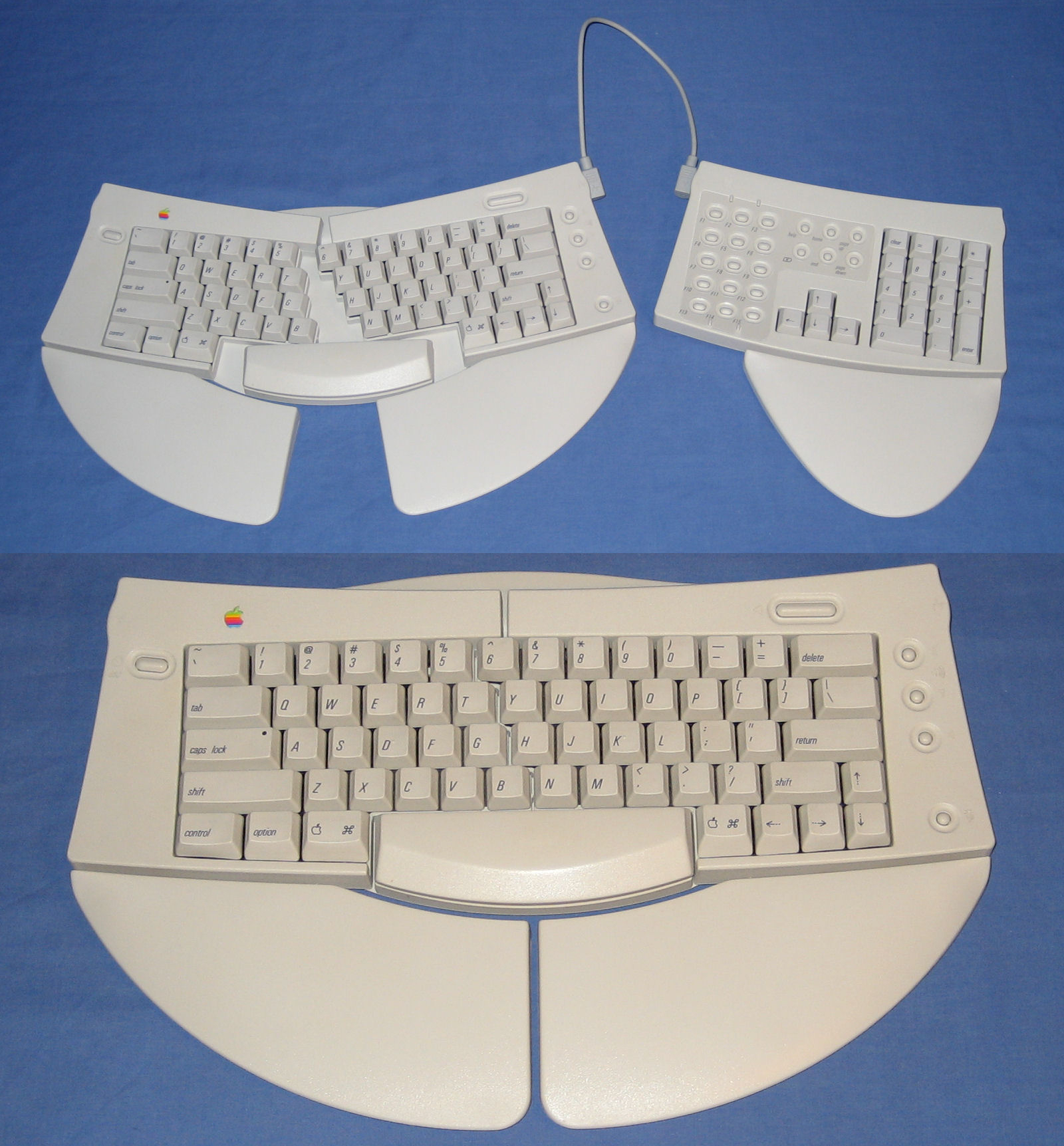
Apple Adjustable Keyboard

The Apple Adjustable Keyboard (model M1242) was sold as an optional upgrade, was Apple's 1993 entry into the ergonomically adjustable keyboard market. It was often criticized for its flimsy construction. It came with a separate keypad (not sold separately), the first to do so since the original Macintosh keyboard.

=== Newton Keyboard ===
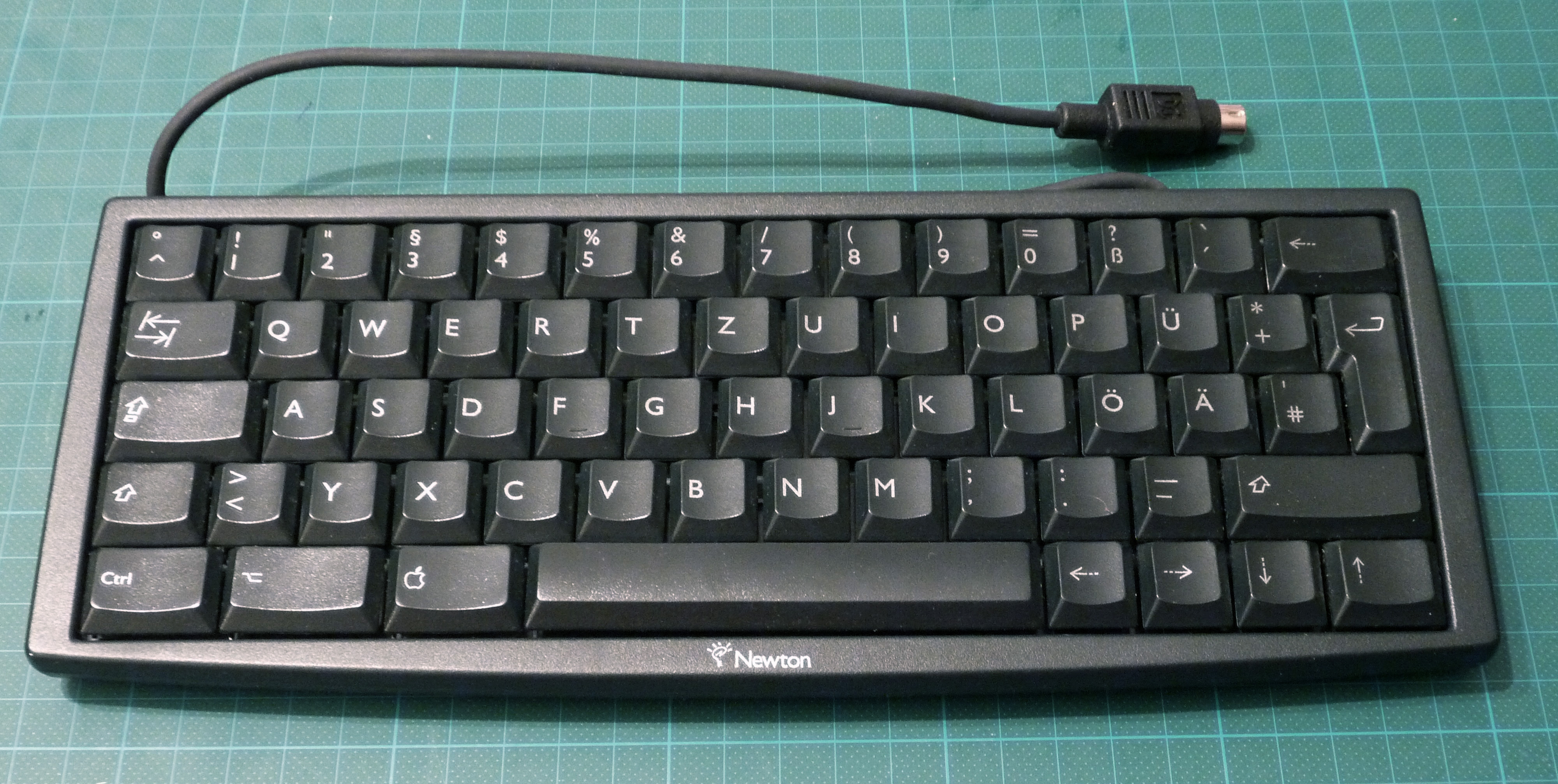
Newton Keyboard, German layout

The Newton Keyboard (model X0044) was introduced in the mid-1990s as a sub-mini keyboard for the Apple Newton to allow a quick input alternative to the Newton's handwriting recognition, which required extensive training to become useful. It connected via the Newton's serial interface. Many Mac users favoring the portable size were able to use it on a Mac utilizing a third-party enabler. Like the iPhone that would come 10 years later, the Newton also included a virtual keyboard.

=== AppleDesign Keyboard ===
AppleDesign Keyboard

The AppleDesign Keyboard (model M2980) was the first major redesign of the Apple keyboard, featuring more fluid, curving lines to match the look of the new Apple product style. It was an unpopular replacement for the Apple Extended Keyboard II in 1994. Significantly lighter than its predecessors, it had a much softer and quieter key interface that was unpopular with many typists. It also included only one ADB port for mice or other pointing devices, concealed on the underside, with the keyboard's cable permanently attached. The Extended II had an ADB port on either side of the keyboard, allowing the keyboard cable or mouse to be attached to the side preferred by the user. This keyboard was also produced in black using the same model number (like the Apple Keyboard II for the Macintosh TV), for inclusion with the black Performa 5420 released primarily in Europe, and the black Power Macintosh 5500 released in Asia.

=== Twentieth Anniversary Macintosh Keyboard ===
The Twentieth Anniversary Macintosh Keyboard (model M3459) was bundled with the Twentieth Anniversary Macintosh in 1997, this keyboard once again excluded an integrated keypad, though unlike the Adjustable Keyboard, none was offered. Based on a PowerBook form factor it also included an optional built-in trackpad and leather palm rests. This was the last ADB keyboard Apple would produce, and was not sold separately.

=== Apple USB Keyboard ===
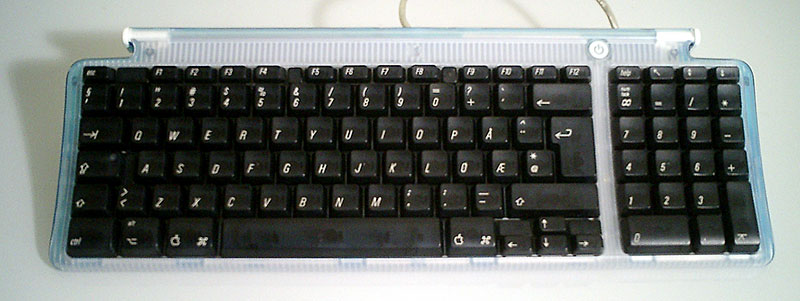
Apple USB Keyboard, Norwegian layout in Bondi blue

The Apple USB Keyboard (model M2452) was released and sold with the iMac in 1998, this became the new standard for all Macintosh models for the next two years. It was the first to use translucent plastics, first in Bondi blue, then in Graphite, a darker gray, for the PowerMac G4 line and fruit-colored for each of the five first color variations of the iMac. It had a built-in retractable support leg. It also marked a return to the standard keyboard with integrated keypad with the enhanced cursor keys above the keypad. The keyboard had a power key on the top right side (implemented by shorting the D-line to ground), and was the last keyboard to have one. This keyboard can be used with Windows (although the power key has no function).

=== Apple Pro Keyboard ===
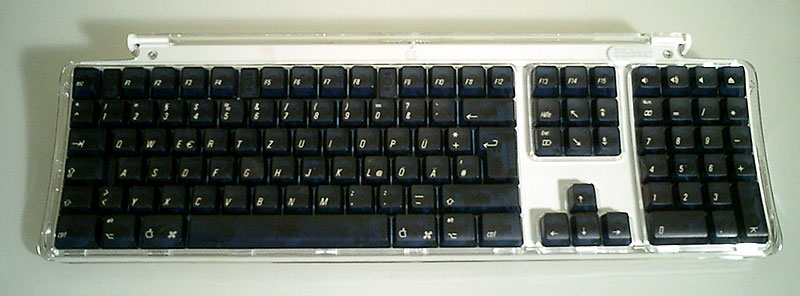
Apple Pro Keyboard, German layout

The Apple Pro Keyboard (model M7803) was originally introduced as the Apple Pro Keyboard in 2000, but discontinued three years later, this keyboard reintroduced the additional extended function keys last seen in the Apple Design Keyboard and debuted in a clear case with semi-transparent black keys. One major departure from all previous ADB and USB keyboards was the removal of the remote power key. This keyboard contained 109 keys (ANSI), and retained the single folding leg on the bottom. This was also the keyboard that came with the Power Mac G4 Cube.

A version with white keys was introduced in 2002 alongside the iMac G4.

=== Apple Keyboard (109 and 78 keys) ===
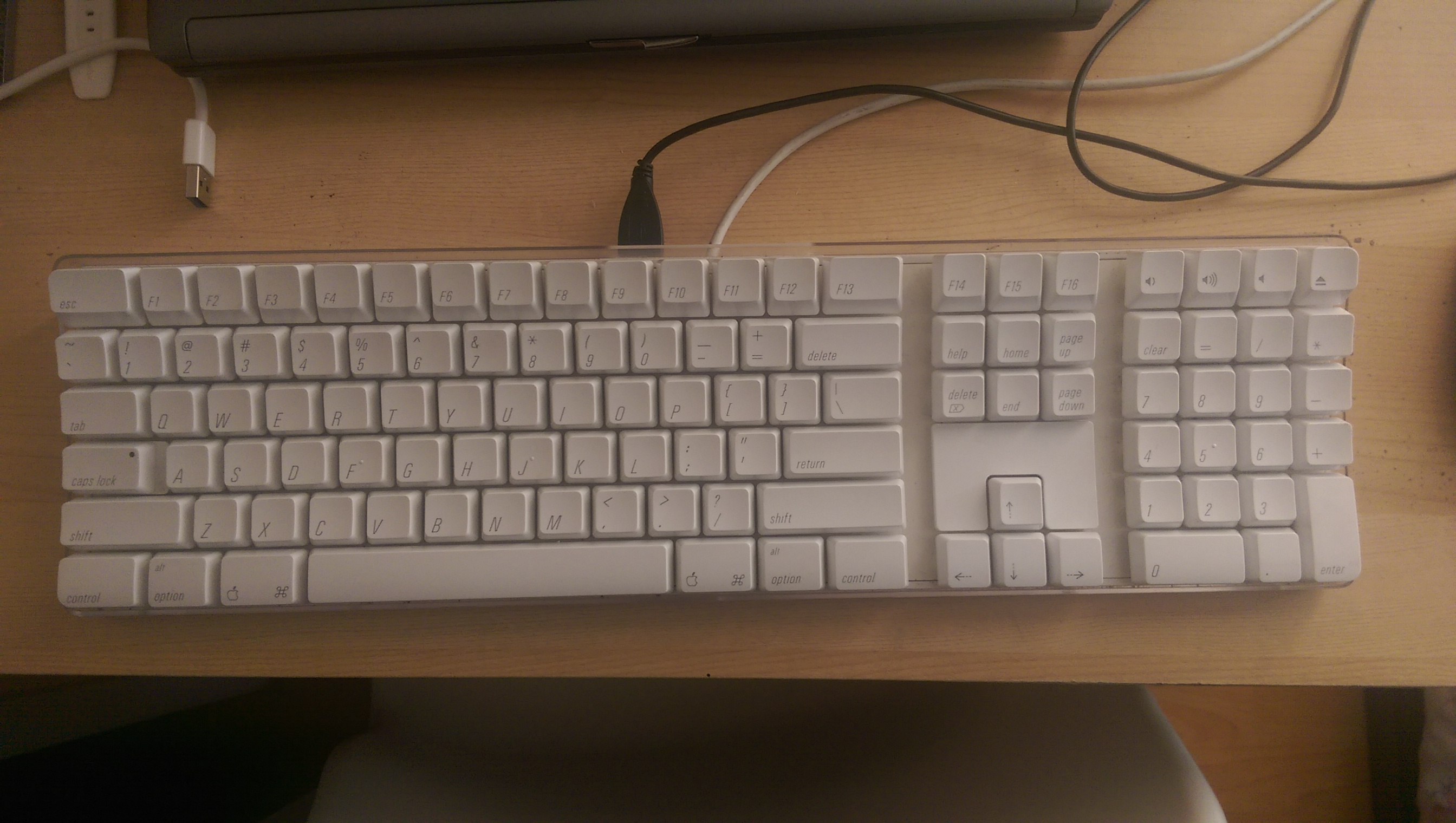
Apple Keyboard (US) (A1048), first sold in 2003

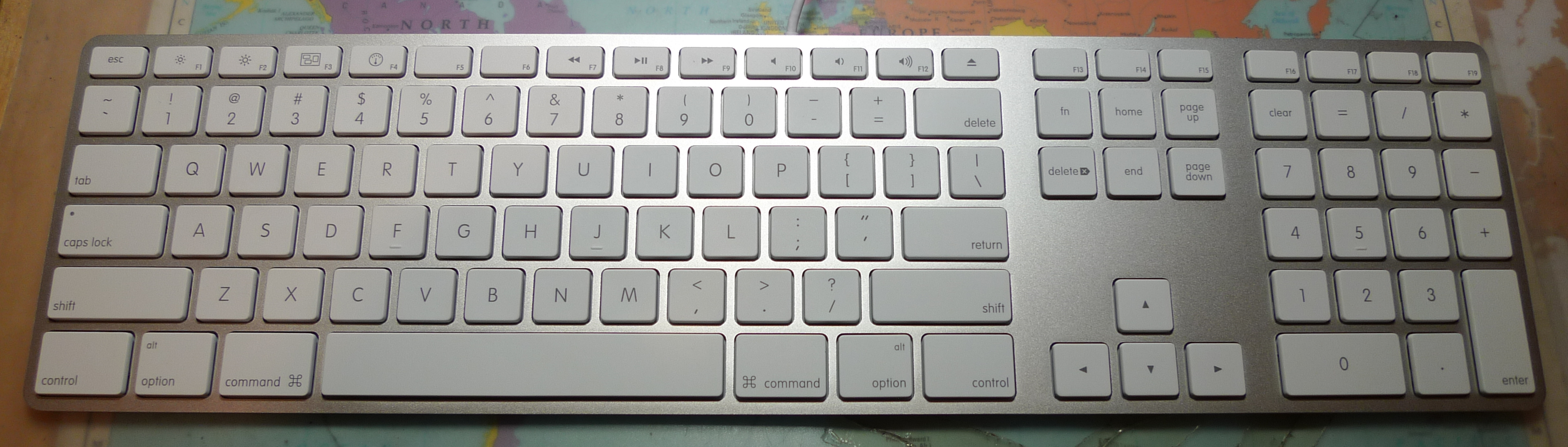
Apple Keyboard (US) (A1243). This photo is of one before the release of Mac OS X Lion; the F4 key has a logo for Dashboard instead of the Launchpad feature added in Mac OS X Lion. Later releases of the keyboard had the Launchpad logo instead.

- (A1048, white, 109 keys, USB 1.1) In May 2003, the keyboard underwent a major redesign which eliminated the frame enclosing the keys while adding an F16 key and moving the USB ports to the back. This revision also renamed the device as just the 'Apple Keyboard', thus dropping 'Pro' from the commercial name, but the complete name 'Apple Pro Keyboard' is always used in internal technical information, as seen in the System Information app for example. The A1048 was available only in white. It was later replaced by Apple's aluminum keyboards.
- (A1243, aluminium, 109 keys, MB110LL/A and MB110LL/B) The Apple Keyboard introduced in 2007, has a solid aluminum enclosure, as does the similarly styled Apple Wireless Keyboard. This same keyboard is also the first of Apple's keyboards in 27 years to omit the long-enduring Apple logo(s) denoting the Command key's backward compatibility with the Apple key that was originally introduced on keyboards compatible with the Apple II. This convention, however, lasted much longer than Apple had intended because of how it was retained by all keyboards which used the Apple Desktop Bus connection standard that the company introduced with the release of the Apple IIGS. By the time that Apple discontinued the external use of ADB, the legacy practice of including the Apple symbol on the Command key had stuck. This model of the Apple keyboard also has two down-stream USB ports, one at each end of the keyboard (like M2452 and M7803). This model was renamed as the 'Apple Keyboard with Numeric Keypad' after the release of the A1242 model in March 2009. This model was discontinued on 5 June 2017 and was the last wired keyboard produced by Apple. It is worth noting that there are two versions of the A1243 keyboard (the MB110LL/A and MB110LL/B), that are distinguished by the icons on the F3 and F4 keys. This slight update took place in July 2011 on the release of OS X Lion and changed the label on the Exposé key (F3) to Mission Control and changing the Dashboard key (F4) to a Launchpad key.
- (A1242, aluminium, 78 keys, iMac) Early 2009 iMac revisions shipped with a new version of the wired keyboard, which omitted the numeric pad, similar to its wireless counterpart. The full keyboard with numeric pad remained available as a build-to-order option for an extra charge, and could also be purchased separately. The A1242 was discontinued in December 2010.

=== Apple Wireless Keyboard ===
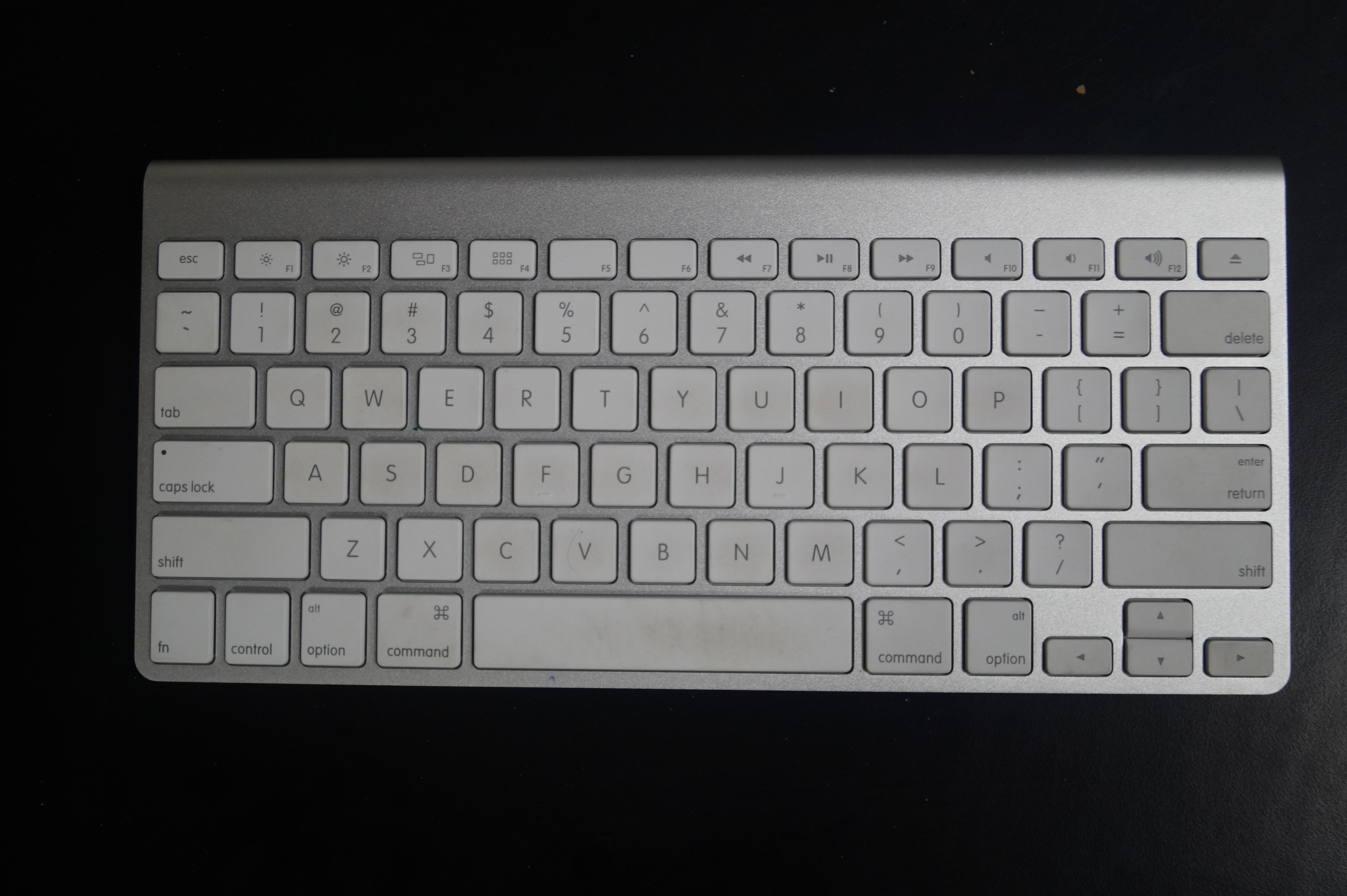
Apple Wireless Keyboard (A1314)

- (A1016, white, 109 keys, Bluetooth 1.1) Introduced in 2003, this model was based on the Bluetooth standard. It was essentially identical to the revised Apple Keyboard offered four months earlier. According to the Apple website, it is not compatible with iPads, unlike later models.
- (A1255, aluminium, 78 keys, Bluetooth) In 2007, an updated model clad in aluminum was released, which, like the MacBook's keyboard, eliminated the integrated numeric keypad and special keys. It takes three AA batteries, with the power button on the right-hand side of the keyboard opposite the battery opening.
- (A1314, aluminium, 78 keys, Bluetooth 2.0, MC184LL/A and MC184LL/B) On October 20, 2009, the aluminum model was updated (MC184LL/A) so that only two AA batteries are needed instead of three; two changes occurred in the physical appearance: firstly, the placement of the plastic window for the Bluetooth transceiver, which moved from the right-hand side of the keyboard's bottom to the centre, and secondly, the keyboard was a few millimeters wider in depth than the previous wireless keyboard. Like the Magic Mouse released on the same date, it requires Mac OS X 10.6 or later. In July 2011, a minor update (MC184LL/B) was made to the previous model, for Mac OS X Lion. The Exposé and Dashboard legends have been replaced with those for Mission Control and Launchpad, respectively.

=== Magic Keyboard (2015) ===
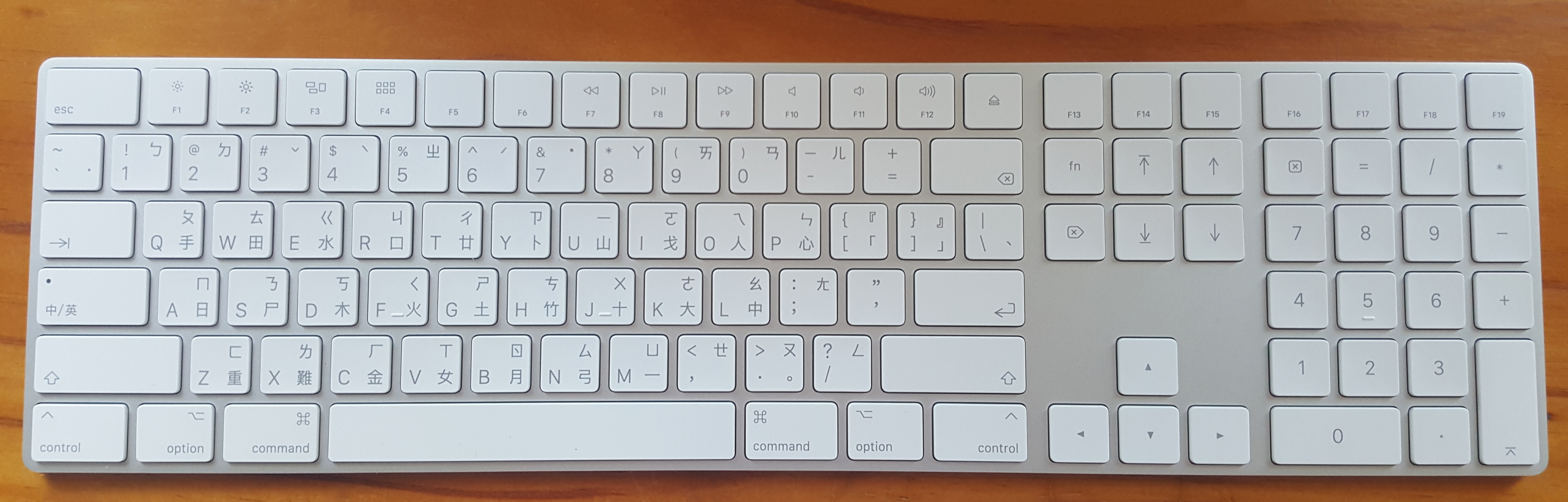
Apple Magic Keyboard with Numeric Keypad (Traditional Chinese) (A1843)

- A1644 Magic Keyboard: 78 keys
  - October 13, 2015 – May 2021: MLA22LL/A (EMC 2815) $99; Silver
    Released for OS X El Capitan and later. It has a built-in rechargeable Lithium-ion battery with a Lightning connector for charging and an on/off switch.
- A1843 Magic Keyboard with Numeric Keypad: 109 keys
  - June 5, 2017 – current: MQ052LL/A (EMC 3138) $129; Silver
  - March 27, 2018 – May 2021: MRMH2LL/A (EMC 3138) $129; Space Gray

=== Smart Keyboard for iPad ===
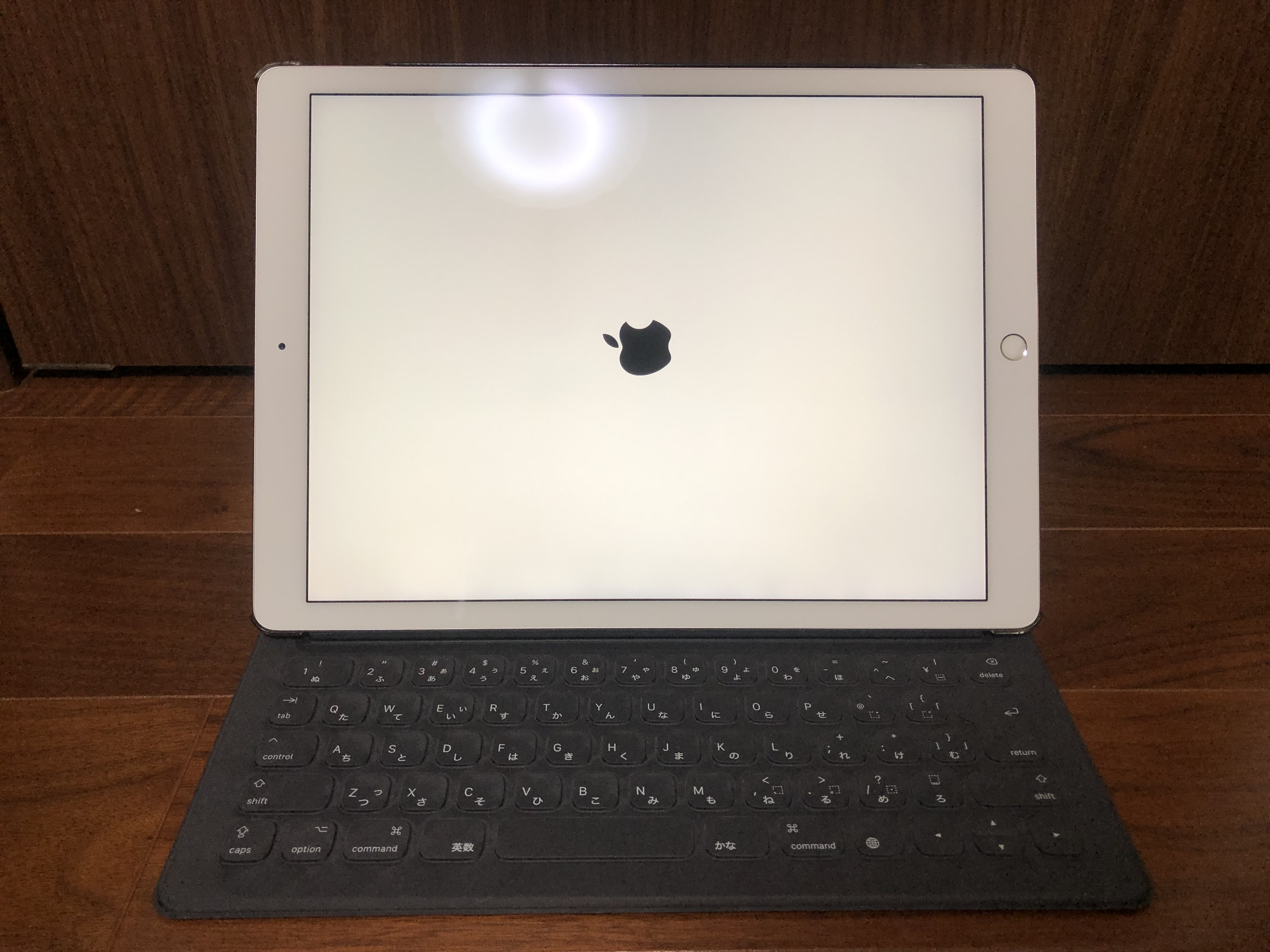
iPad Pro (2nd generation) on a Smart Keyboard

The Smart Keyboard is a keyboard cover for Apple's iPad tablet computers. It was released in November 2015 alongside the iPad Pro. It is powered by the iPad's Smart Connector, and does not require separate charging or batteries. Its keys use a butterfly-switch mechanism, with its keys covered by a fabric material. When unfolded, the Smart Keyboard only allows for one viewing angle position; when folded, the Smart Keyboard only protects the front of the iPad. The Smart Keyboard is compatible with iPad Pro models from 2015 to 2017, the iPad Air (3rd generation), and iPad models from 2019 to 2021. At release, it received criticism for its high price tag.

An updated design, named Smart Keyboard Folio, was released alongside the iPad Pro (3rd generation), with support for two viewing angles and back protection. The Smart Keyboard Folio is compatible with 11-inch and 12.9-inch iPad Pro models from 2018 and later, and iPad Air models from 2020 and later.

== See also ==
- Apple pointing devices
- IBM PC keyboard
- iPhone text input
- Timeline of Apple Inc. products
