= MinebeaMitsumi =

Japanese multinational corporation

MinebeaMitsumi, Inc.

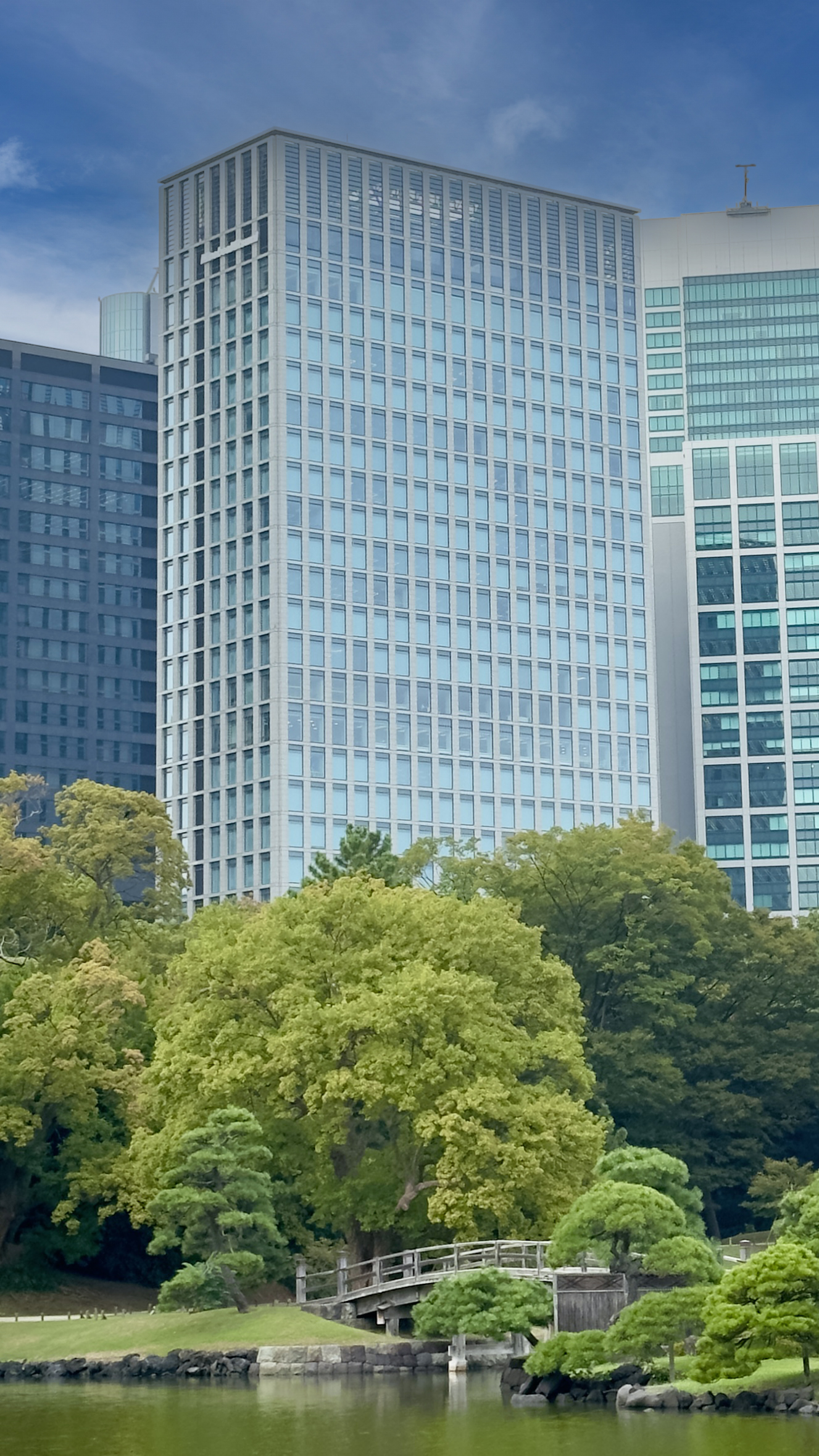
- MinebeaMitsumi's Tokyo headquarters in Higashi-Shimbashi, Minato
- Native name: ミネベアミツミ株式会社
- Romanized name: MinebeaMitsumi kabushiki gaisha
- Formerly: Nippon Miniature Bearing Company (1951-1981); Minebea Co., Ltd (1981-2017)
- Type: Public KK
- Traded as: TYO: 6479; Nikkei 225 component (TYO)
- Industry: Machinery; Electronics; Defense technology
- Founded: 16 July 1951; 75 years ago
- Headquarters: Higashi-Shimbashi, Minato, Tokyo; Miyota, Kitasaku District, Nagano (registered office), Japan
- Key people: Yoshihisa Kainuma, (CEO and President)
- Products: Machinery components; Rotary components; Electronic devices and components; Firearms
- Revenue: ▲$ 8.999 billion (FY 2020)
- Net income: ▼$ 422.85 million (FY 2020)
- Number of employees: MinebeaMitsumi Group: 81,167; U-Shin Group: 7,444 (excluding temporary employees)
- Website: Official website

MinebeaMitsumi, Inc. (ミネベアミツミ株式会社, MinebeaMitsumi Kabushiki-gaisha) is a Japanese multinational manufacturer of mechanical components and electronic devices. The company's headquarters are located in Higashi-Shinbashi, Minato, Tokyo, and its registered office is located in Miyota, Nagano.

As of June 30, 2019, MinebeaMitsumi comprises 121 consolidated subsidiaries and affiliates. NMB (USA) Inc. (Nippon Miniature Bearing) is an American holding company that manages Minebea's American subsidiaries.

== History ==
The company was founded as Nippon Miniature Bearing Co., Ltd. (日本ミネチュアベアリング株式会社, Nippon Minechua Bearingu Kabushiki-gaisha) in July 1951. In July 1975, Shin-Chuo Industries was merged with it.

In October 1981, after some mergers, the company name was shortened to Minebea Co., Ltd. (ミネベア株式会社, Minebea Kabushiki-gaisha).

On January 27, 2017, Minebea acquired Mitsumi for $500 million and changed its name to MinebeaMitsumi.

== Major businesses and subsidiaries ==
=== NMB Technologies Corporation ===
NMB deals in sales of:

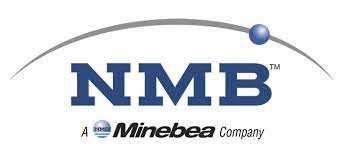
NMB Technologies official logo

- Bearings
  - Bearing-related products:
    - pivot assemblies, precision mechanical assemblies
- Machined components
  - Defence-related special components (exclusively to the Japan Ministry of Defense)
- Electronic devices & components
- Measuring components
  - Strain gauges, force sensors, pressure sensors, vector sensors
  - Load cells, pressure cells, torque transducers, digital indicators, tensile and compression testing machines
  - Fan motors, blowers, high-pressure blowers, fan units
  - Hybrid type stepping motors, Pulse Modulation (PM) stepping motors, small diameter/high-speed PM stepping motors
  - Brush DC motors, small brushless motors, powerful brushless motors, polygon mirror scanner motors
  - HDD spindle motors, rotation angle sensors, Fluidized bed dryer(FBD) motors

In August 2015, a Minebea product gained an entry in the Guinness World Records for being the smallest commercially available mass-produced steel ball bearing in the world. The product concerned was first introduced in 2009, and is primarily used by domestic watchmakers in a number of high-grade mechanical watches to support delicate axles, instead of traditionally used jewels.

=== Mitsumi Electric ===
Logo of Mitsumi

Mitsumi's product portfolio includes:

- Integrated circuits
- Power supplies
- Alternating current adaptors
- Chargers
- Internal power supplies
- High-frequency devices
- Communication equipment
- Internet protocol equipment

=== ABLIC Inc ===
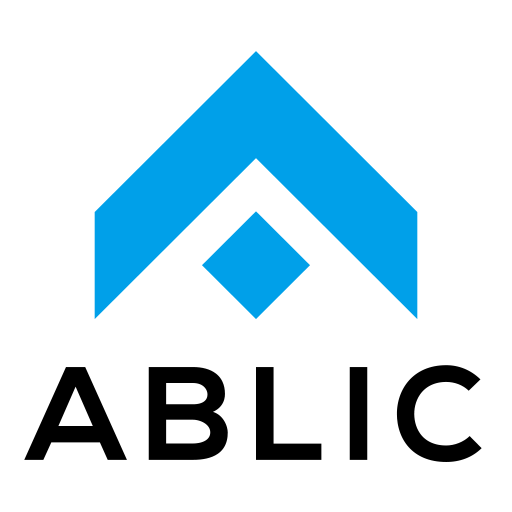
ABLIC official logo.

ABLIC Inc was acquired by MinebeaMitsumi in 2019.

- Power Management ICs
- Sensors
- Memory
- Amplifiers
- Automotive ICs
- Healthcare

=== U-Shin ===
U-Shin was founded in 1926 and has been a subsidiary of MinebeaMitsumi since 2019. It has R&D centres in the US, India, Germany, France. The capital as of March 2021 is 15,206 (million yen) and the consolidated sales stand at 105,133(million yen). U-Shin is headquartered at Minato-ku, Tokyo.

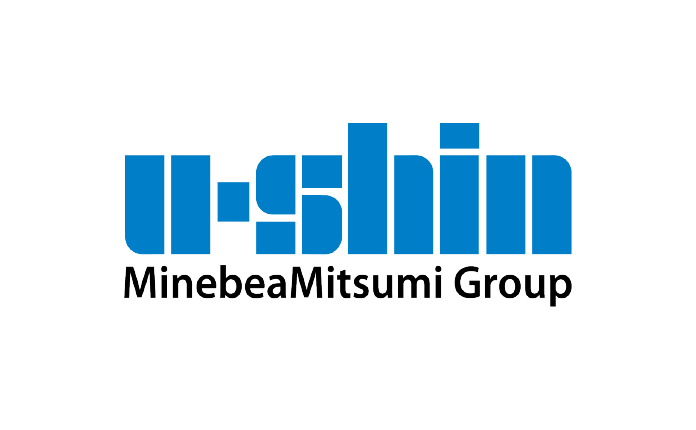
U-Shin official logo.

U-Shin deals in the following:

- Automotive Division
  - Electronic devices
  - Electronic steering column locks
  - Climate control systems
  - Latches
  - Power closure system
  - Car flush handles
  - Switches and sensors
  - Locksets
  - Industrial Equipment Division
  - Fuel pumps

=== Paradox Engineering ===
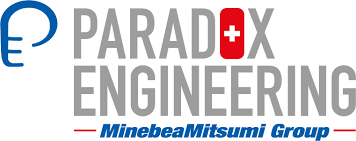
Paradox Engineering official logo

Paradox Engineering is MinebeaMitsumi's R&D center for the Internet of Things. The company is based in Switzerland and develops IoT solutions for cities and other smart environments.

Paradox Engineering has a Central Management System of choice for all Cities using PE Smart Urban Network to manage and control Wireless IoT applications – Smart Lighting, Smart Parking, Smart Energy and any other sensor-based application – and Wireless High speed loT services – pervasive Wi-Fi, video surveillance, emergency response systems.

MinebeaAccessSolutions India (MAS-India)

In February 2025, to expand production capacity for aircraft engine components and machined products, a new third factory of Mach Aero Components Private Ltd. (located in Karnataka, India, hereafter MACPL) will be established and begin operations, enhancing the overall business of the Minebea Mitsumi Group in India.

Furthermore, due to the rapidly growing business in India for two-wheeled and four-wheeled vehicles, a new MAS India factory will be established.

Once this factory is fully operational, the total production capacity for MAS's global products for two-wheeled and four-wheeled vehicles is planned to increase by about 1.2 times compared to the current level when converted to the number of completed vehicles.

== Shares ==
MinebeaMitsumi shares are listed on the Tokyo Stock Exchange and the Osaka Securities Exchange, the company is a constituent of the Nikkei 225 stock index.

Minebea has the world's largest shares in 6 product areas such as ball bearings (65%) and pivot assemblies (65%). International Asian business accounts for 80% of Minebea's production and 50% of its sales.

=== Major shareholders ===
(top 10 shareholders, as of September 30, 2013)

- Japan Trustee Services Bank, Ltd. (Trust Account) – 31,364,000 – 8.29%
- The Master Trust Bank of Japan, Ltd. (Trust Account) – 27,583,000 – 7.29%
- National Mutual Insurance Federation of Agricultural Cooperatives – 15,761,000 – 4.17%
- Takahashi Industrial and Economic Research Foundation – 15,447,330 – 4.08%
- Sumitomo Mitsui Trust Bank, Limited – 15,349,000 – 4.06%
- Keiaisha Co., Ltd. – 15,000,000 – 3.97%
- Japan Trustee Services Bank, Ltd. (Trust Account 4) – 13,081,000 – 3.46%
- Japan Trustee Services Bank, Ltd. (Trust Account 9) – 11,501,000 – 3.04%
- The Bank of Tokyo-Mitsubishi UFJ, Ltd. – 10,057,839 – 2.66%
- Sumitomo Mitsui Banking Corporation – 10,000,475 – 2.64%

== See also ==
- Hi-Tek Corporation
- Minebea Mitsumi FC
