= The Keyboard Company =

Defunct American computer peripheral manufacturer

Coordinates: 33°47′56″N 118°00′31″W

Apple Accessory Products Division

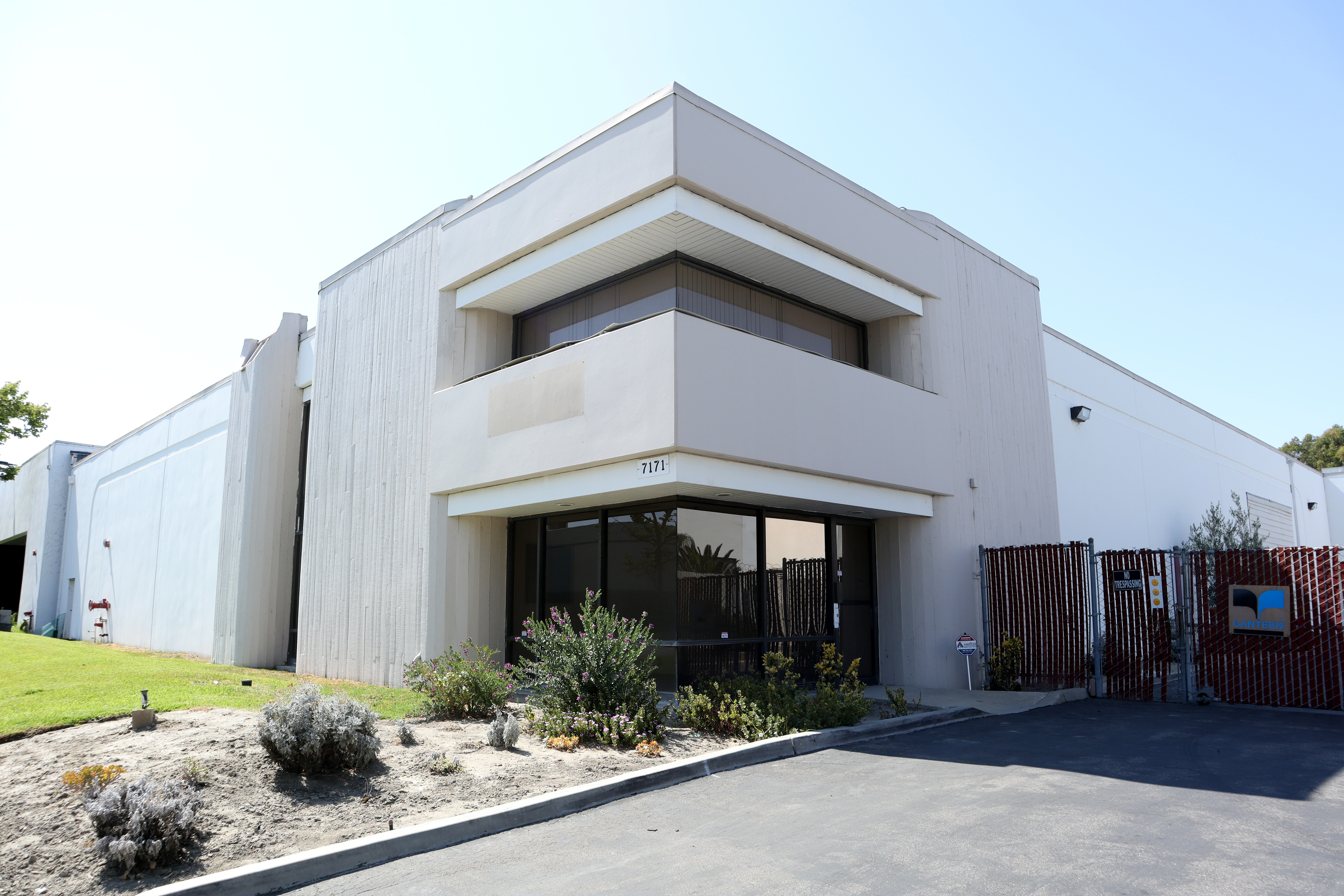
- Former headquarters in Garden Grove, California
- Formerly: The Keyboard Company, Inc.
- Type: Private
- Industry: Electronics
- Founded: May 4, 1979; 47 years ago in Garden Grove, California, United States
- Founder: Michael Muller
- Defunct: August 28, 1985; 41 years ago
- Fate: Acquired by Alps Electric
- Products: Computer keyboards, mice, joysticks
- Number of employees: 661 (1985, peak)
- Parent: Apple Computer (1982–1985)

The Keyboard Company, Inc., was an American electronics company based in Garden Grove, California. It was contracted by Apple Computer to produce the keyboards of their microcomputers in the late 1970s and early 1980s. The company also produced a number of peripherals separately for Apple's systems. Apple acquired the company in 1982 and renamed it the Apple Accessory Products Division (APD).

== History ==
The Keyboard Company was founded by Michael Muller (born c. 1944). The company was incorporated on May 4, 1979. Muller was previously general manager of Datanetics of Fountain Valley, California, which manufactured keyboards for early electronic desktop calculators and cash registers. Datanetics was purchased by International Telephone & Telegraph in 1976. In spring 1977, Steve Jobs of the fledgling Apple Computer commissioned Datanetics to produce the keyboards for the original Apple II. Shortly afterwards, several computer manufacturers (including Mattel Electronics) hired Datanetics for computer keyboard production. Jobs suggested Muller form his own company to focus on manufacturing Apple's keyboards in early 1978. By September 1979, the newly formed Keyboard Company, although legally separate, acted as a wholly owned subsidiary of Apple, assuming responsibility of manufacturing Apple II keyboard units. The Keyboard Company soon manufactured roughly 50,000 units a month in their Garden Grove plant.

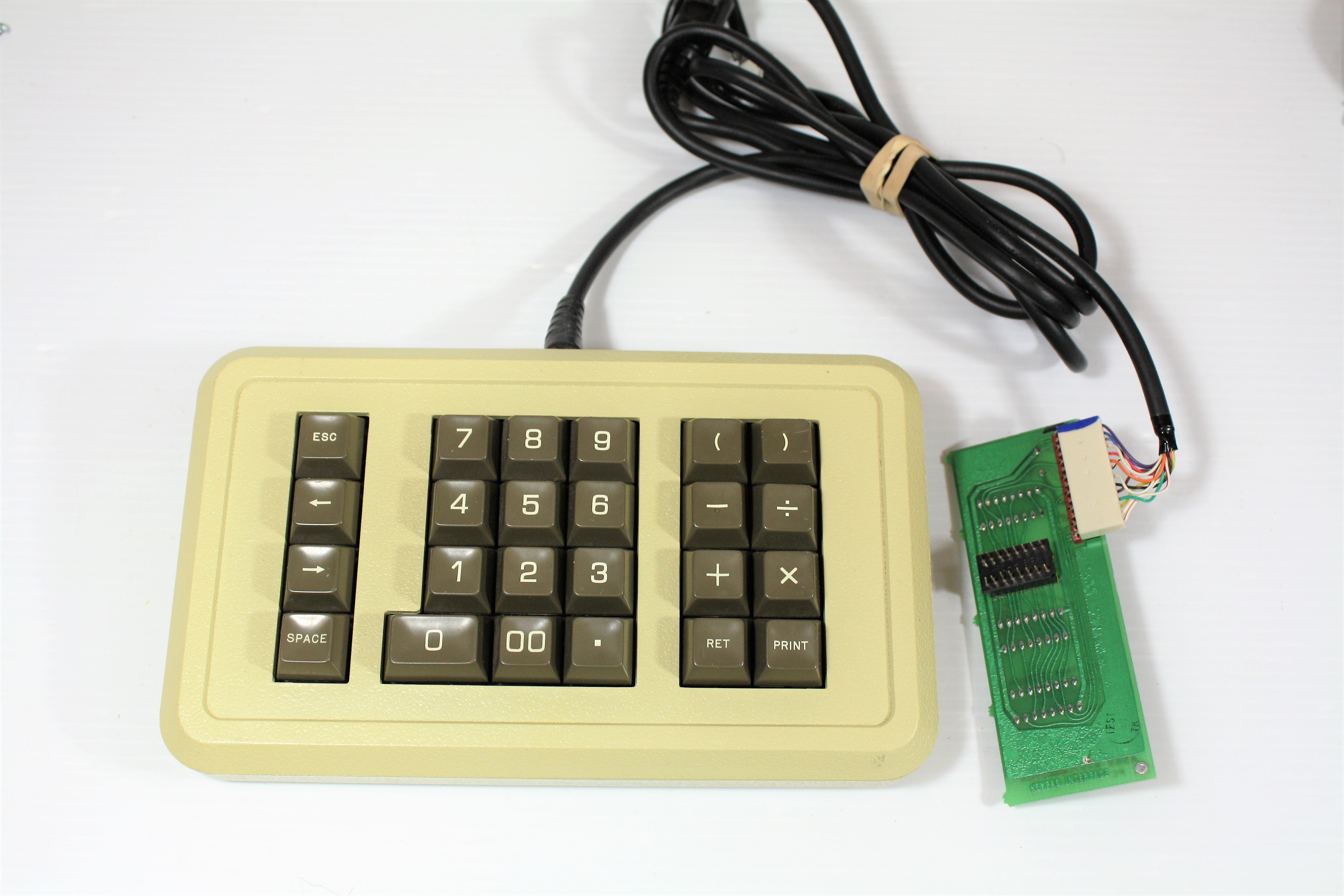
The Keyboard Company's numeric keypad, with daughter board

In late 1979 or early 1980, the company released its first peripheral, an external numeric keypad for the Apple II. The core demographic of Apple II's initial marketing efforts was the accounting industry; due to the first Apple II's lack of a numeric keypad, Muller felt that his would fill a niche. The Keyboard Company's numpad proved popular among VisiCalc users, with author Roger E. Clark writing that the numpad was "a superb peripheral device that we use daily and sincerely recommend". Clark also noted that installation was easy, requiring no soldering, which would have voided the user's warranty with Apple. The keypad package included a daughterboard, which could be inserted into a free space within the Apple II's chassis. The ribbon cable connecting the Apple II's keyboard was then removed and connected to a similar header on the daughterboard. A ribbon cable was provided connecting the numpad to the daughterboard via another header.

Apple again commissioned the Keyboard Company to manufacture the keyboards for the Apple III in spring 1980. The Apple III's keyboard included a numeric keypad. Meanwhile Apple's periphery demographic of video gamers grew to be one of its core users, and the Keyboard Company responded with the Joystick II and Cursor III in 1981. These joysticks were made for the Apple II and Apple III respectively. The company introduced Hand Controllers, paddle controllers sold as a pair, in 1982.

On April 1, 1982, Apple Computer purchased the Keyboard Company and its Garden Grove facility outright. The subsidiary was renamed to Accessory Products Division (APD), with Muller named as president and general manager. Muller spurred the development of a range of printers of varying technologies, which in the 1980s resulted in the LaserWriter and ImageWriter, among others. In 1984, Apple Computer reorganized itself into three business units. Besides the Apple II and Apple 32 divisions—the latter responsible for development and production of the Lisa and Macintosh—APD was made its own unit. Muller was reaffirmed as president of APD, and thereafter he opened an APD factory in Millstreet, County Cork, Ireland. He left Apple in 1987.

The Garden Grove plant employed 661 workers in February 1985. Layoffs in mid-1985 reduced the workforce to 275. In August 1985, Alps Electric of Tokyo, Japan, announced its plans to acquire its Garden Grove plant from Apple while retaining the remaining employees. The deal was finalized on August 28, 1985. In the late 1990s, the factory under ownership of Alps was 500 strong; it focused on producing mice for Apple. However, in 1997, Alps gave employees six-month to one-year notices that the plant was to shut down, with most receiving retention bonuses. The plant was finally shut down in spring 1998.

== See also ==
- Hi-Tek Corporation, another computer keyboard manufacturer based in Garden Grove
