= Hi-Tek Corporation =

Defunct American electronics company

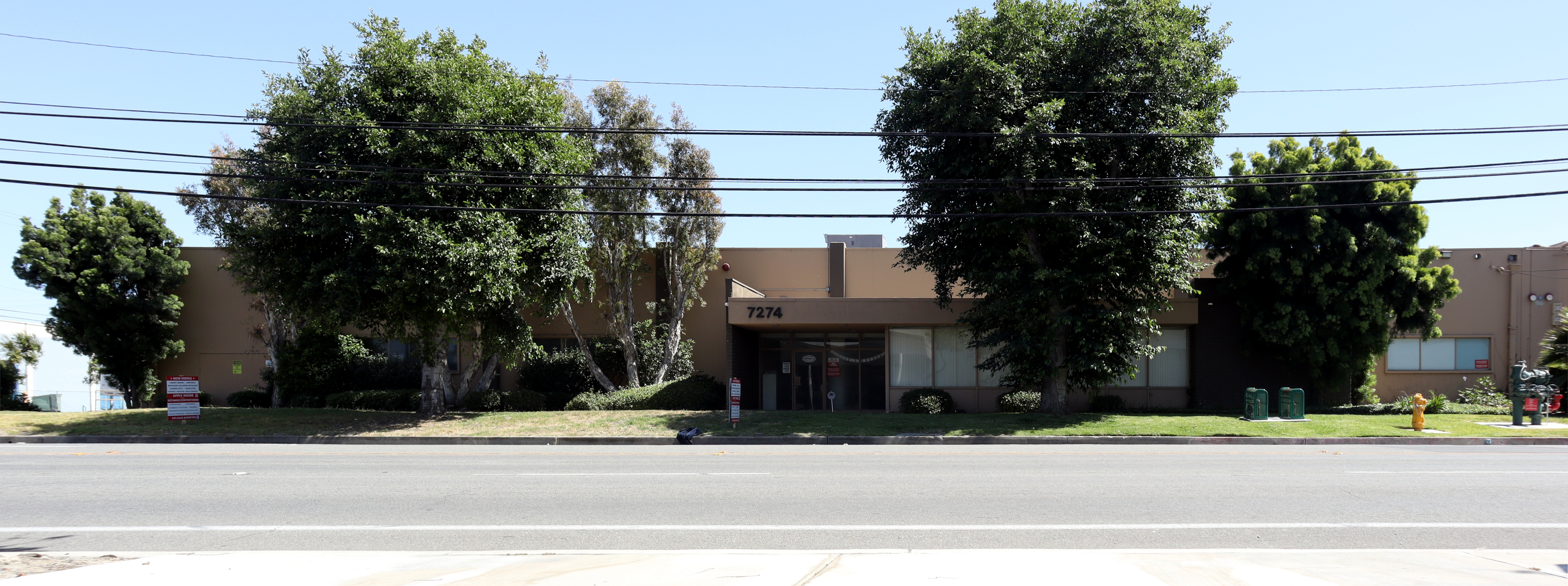
- Former headquarters in Garden Grove, California
- Type: Private
- Industry: Electronics
- Founded: c. 1967; 59 years ago in Santa Ana, California
- Founder: Don Hallerberg
- Defunct: 1988; 38 years ago
- Fate: Acquired by Nippon Miniature Bearing in 1983; subsidiary merged into NMB Technologies in 1988
- Successor: NMB Hi-Tek Corporation
- Headquarters: Garden Grove, California, United States; 33°46′50″N 118°00′23″W
- Products: Computer keyboards
- Number of employees: 600 (1979, peak)
- Parent: Nippon Miniature Bearing

Hi-Tek Corporation (later NMB Hi-Tek Corporation) was an American electronics company based in California. At first making relays, actuators, and timers in the 1960s, the company pivoted to the manufacture of keyboard assemblies and discrete keyswitches in the late 1970s. They proved successful in the keyboard business, gaining clients such as Hewlett-Packard and Texas Instruments, and were acquired by Nippon Miniature Bearing in 1983.

== History ==
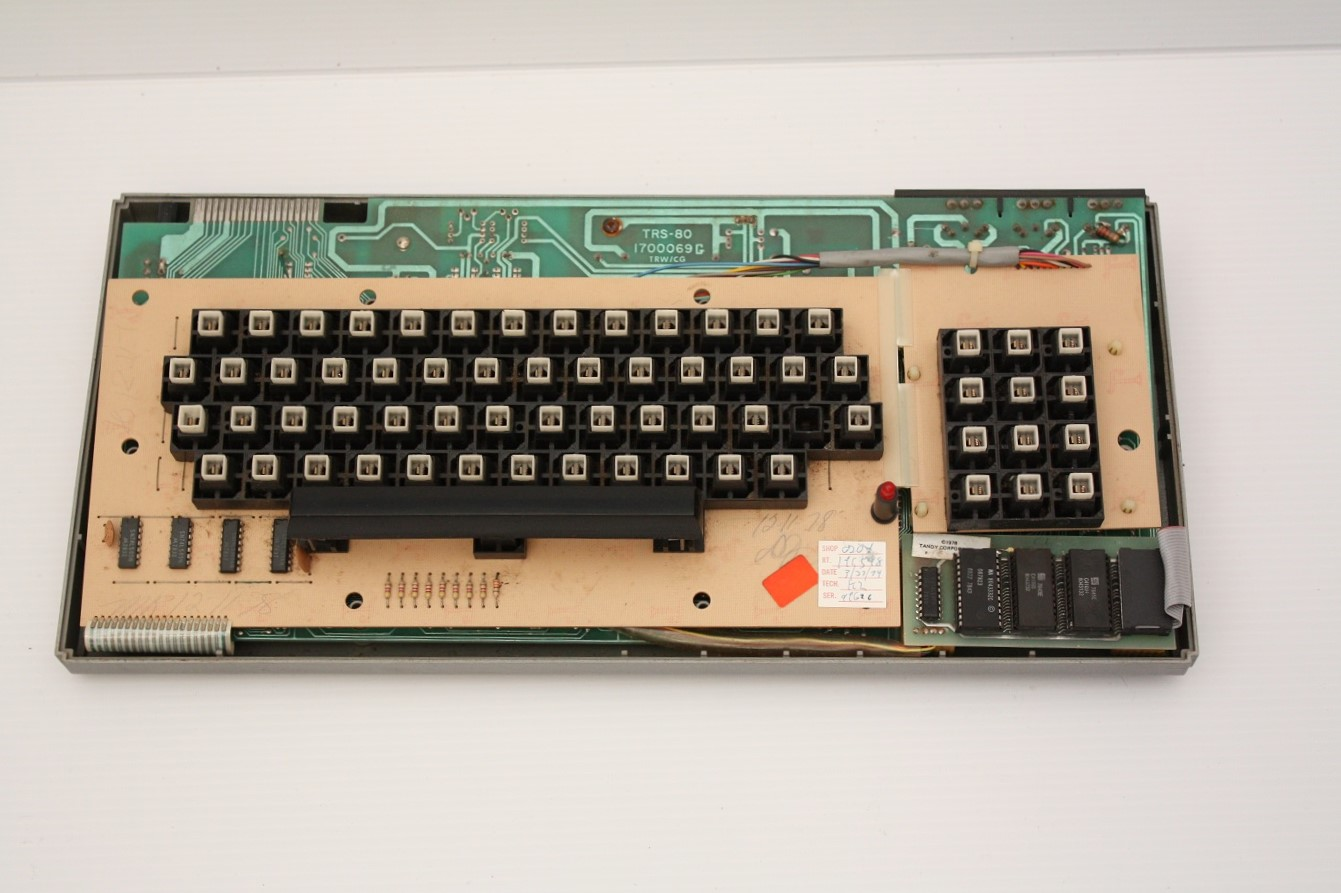
Hi-Tek keyboard assembly in a TRS-80 Model I (1978 issue)

Hi-Tek Corporation was founded in Santa Ana, California, in 1967 by Donald "Don" Hallerberg. Among the company's first products were solid-state, time-delay relays, available as time-adjustable and fixed-duration units. Hi-Tek briefly had an aerospace division in the late 1960s, after general manager Francois X. Chevrier was issued a patent for a mechanical parachute ripcord. The ripcord actuated via a spring-operated cable; most contemporary ripcords used squibs for actuation. However, Hi-Tek's ripcords were subject to a recall owing to a failure of a heat-treated spring, and the company sold the technology to the FXC Corporation.

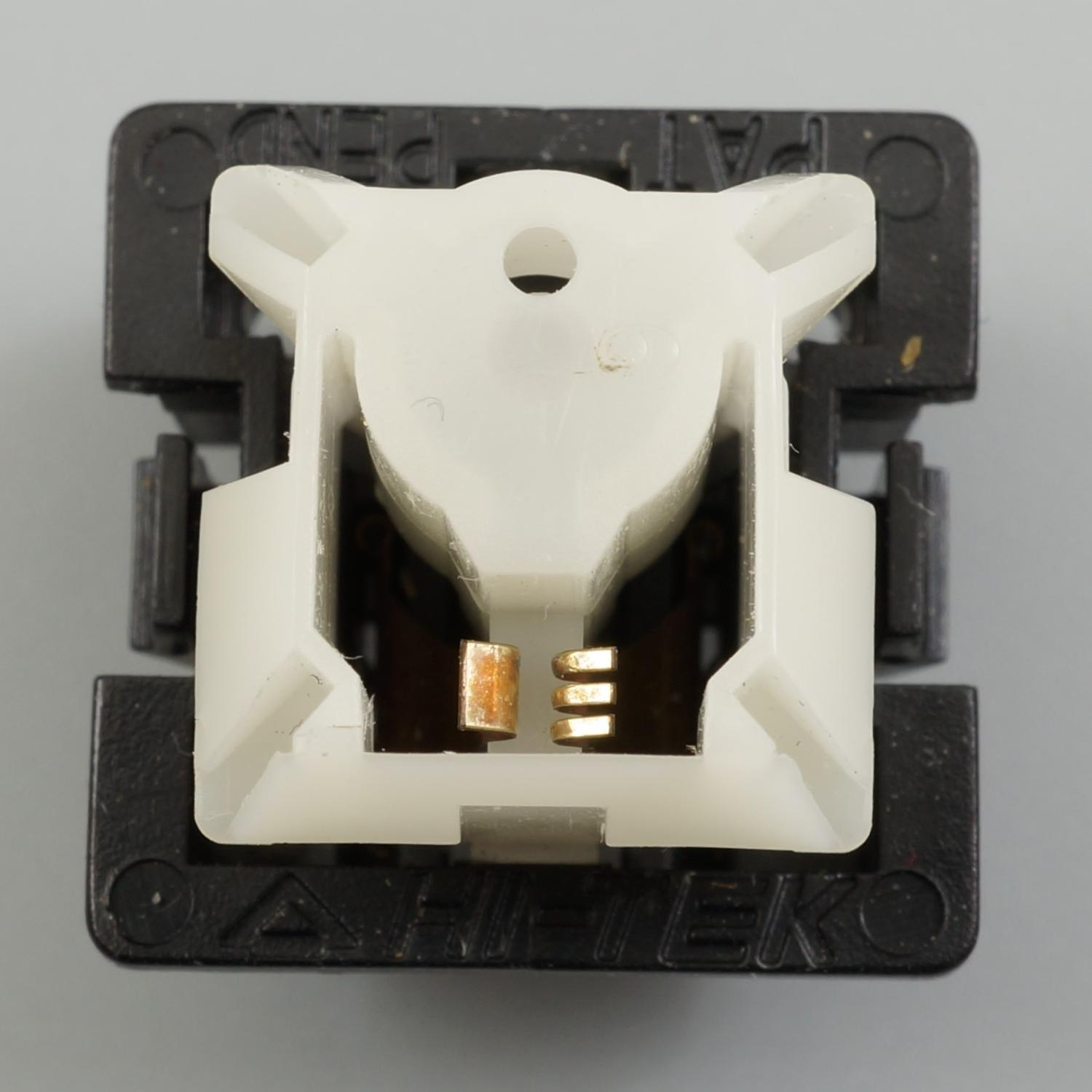
First generation Series 725 keyswitch (linear variant)

By 1977 the company employed 110 workers in its Santa Ana headquarters and had expanded to production of actuators and timers and other timing devices. Between 1977 and 1979, the company moved to a 46,000 square-foot factory Garden Grove, California, and expanded its employee base to 600 workers. The company began producing mechanical-switch keyboard assemblies for original equipment manufacturers in the turn of the 1980s. The clientele for Hi-Tek's keyboard included Digital Equipment Corporation, Texas Instruments, and Hewlett-Packard, among others. Stackpole Corporation of Raleigh, North Carolina, implemented a similar design for their own mechanical keyboard mechanisms around the same time. Hi-Tek alleged patent infringement in 1980, resulting in a failed lawsuit that was dismissed in 1982.

Hi-Tek was acquired by and made a subsidiary of Minebea–NMB (Nippon Miniature Bearing) of Japan in July 1983. NMB Hi-Tek reported good profit in 1984 but expected restricted growth in 1985 amid a downturn in the passive component industry worldwide. The subsidiary began moving the majority of production to Thailand that year, finishing in 1986. The company's Garden Grove headquarters was then limited to research and development, prototyping, and marketing, as well as small-quantity production.

In late 1984, the subsidiary introduced the 725 series of discrete mechanical keyboard switches. These switches were designed for comfort and reliability—the switches were rated for a lifetime of 100 million keystrokes—while still being lower-cost than competing switch mechanisms. The switch comprised two contacts splayed apart by a spacer; the contacts are bent in such away to move together as the spacer is depressed along with the key, until a connection between the contacts is made. Its rated actuation force of 2 oz (57 g) was relatively low, as was its key travel of 0.14 in (3.6 mm). The switches were designed to rectify problems inherent in many contemporary key switch designs of its day, including low-reliability, contact bounce, key "wobble" (lateral travel), and high-cost. The switches were available in linear and tactile variants on their launch. The subsidiary manufactured keyboards featuring these switches that possessed n-key rollover, integrated LED in lock keys, and a 30-character typeahead buffer, among other features. These keyboards were later branded under the Right Touch name and supported PC/XT and PC/AT protocol.

NMB Hi-Tek Corporation introduced a line of rubber-dome keyboards in early 1985. By contrast, these keyboards were intended solely to be cost-reduced compared to Hi-Tek's earlier mechanical keyboards; they were based on an enlargement of NMB's own rubber dome sheet designs for its pocket calculators. Production of these keyboards was performed in Thailand.

Two years after NMB acquired Hi-Tek, the Garden Grove facility employed approximately 200 workers. The plant was shuttered around late 1987, when production was fully moved to Thailand. The NMB Hi-Tek Corporation—along with three other NMB subsidiaries—was merged into the newly formed NMB Technologies in early 1988. NMB Technologies was set up in Chatsworth, Los Angeles. NMB Technologies used the Hi-Tek name for its keyboard manufacturing division, which grew decently in 1988 (between 30 and 35 percent). They projected slower sales in 1989, however. The Hi-Tek name was retired in about 1990.

== See also ==
- The Keyboard Company, another computer keyboard manufacturer based in Garden Grove
