= 22H2 =

22H2 may refer to one of the following versions of the Microsoft Windows operating system:

- Windows 10 22H2
- Windows 11 22H2
