= Windows 11 version history =

List of Windows 11 operating system versions

Windows 11 is a major release of the Windows NT operating system developed by Microsoft that was released in October 2021. Starting with Windows 10, Microsoft described Windows as an "operating system as a service" that would receive ongoing updates to its features and functionality, augmented with the ability for enterprise environments to receive non-critical updates at a slower pace or use long-term support milestones that will only receive critical updates, such as security patches, over their five-year lifespan of mainstream support.

== Overview ==
As with Windows 10 (since version 20H2), mainstream builds of Windows 11 are labeled "YYHX", with YY representing the two-digit year and X representing the half-year of planned release (for example, version 21H2 refers to builds which initially released in the second half of 2021).

Overview of Windows 11 versions
Name	Version	Codename	Build	Platform	CPU μarch	Release date	End of support by edition			
Name	Version	Codename	Build	Platform	CPU μarch	Release date	GAC		LTSC	
Name	Version	Codename	Build	Platform	CPU μarch	Release date	Home, Pro, SE, Pro Education, Pro for Workstations	Education, Enterprise, IoT Enterprise	Mainstream	Extended
Windows 11, version 21H2	21H2	Sun Valley	22000	Cobalt	x64, ARM	October 5, 2021	October 10, 2023	October 8, 2024	—N/a	
Windows 11, version 22H2	22H2	Sun Valley 2	22621	Nickel	x64, ARM	September 20, 2022	October 8, 2024	October 14, 2025	—N/a	
Windows 11, version 23H2	23H2	Sun Valley 3	22631	Nickel	x64, ARM	October 31, 2023	November 11, 2025	November 10, 2026	—N/a	
Windows 11, version 24H2	24H2	Hudson Valley	26100	Germanium	x64, ARM	October 1, 2024 (Note: Generally available for Copilot+ PCs from June 15, 2024.)	October 13, 2026	October 12, 2027	October 9, 2029	October 10, 2034
Windows 11, version 25H2	25H2	—N/a	26200	Germanium	x64, ARM	September 30, 2025	October 12, 2027	October 10, 2028	—N/a	
Windows 11, version 26H1 (Note: Only available to devices with certain ARM processors.)	26H1	—N/a	28000	Bromine	ARM	February 10, 2026	March 14, 2028	March 13, 2029	—N/a	
Windows 11, version 26H2	26H2	—N/a	26300	Germanium	x64, ARM	September 29, 2026	October 10, 2028	October 9, 2029	—N/a	
Legend: Unsupported Supported Latest version Preview version

== Version history ==
=== Version 21H2 (original release) ===
The original version of Windows 11 (also known as version 21H2 and codenamed "Sun Valley") was released in October 2021. It carries the build number 10.0.22000.The first public preview build was made available to Windows Insiders who opted in to the Dev Channel on June 28, 2021. Notable changes in this version include:

- Redesigned Fluent Design System:
  - Most interfaces in Windows 11 feature rounded geometry, refreshed iconography, new typography, and a refreshed colour palette.
  - Windows 11 also introduces "Mica", a new opaque Material that is tinted with the color of the desktop wallpaper.
- Significantly redesigned Start menu, adhering to the principles of the updated Fluent Design System.
- Center-aligned Taskbar, with new animations for pinning, rearranging, minimizing, and switching apps.
- The File Explorer has been refreshed with the Fluent Design System and the Ribbon interface has been replaced with a new command bar with a revamped user interface and a Mica background. It also introduces revamped context menus with rounded corners, larger text, and Acrylic.
- New Windows Subsystem for Android.

The update has reached end of service on October 10, 2023 for Home, Pro, Pro Education and Pro for Workstations editions. The Enterprise, Enterprise multi-session, IoT Enterprise and Education editions have reached end of service on October 8, 2024.

=== Version 22H2 (2022 Update) ===
The Windows 11 2022 Update (also known as version 22H2 and codenamed "Sun Valley 2") is the first major update to Windows 11. It carries the build number 10.0.22621. Five component updates were released for this version–"Moment 1" with build 22621.675 on October 18, 2022, "Moment 2" with build 22621.1344 on February 28, 2023, "Moment 3" with build 22621.1778 on May 24, 2023, "Moment 4" with build 22621.2361 on September 26, 2023, and "Moment 5" with build 22621.3235 on February 29, 2024.

The first preview was released to Insiders who opted in to the Dev Channel on September 2, 2021. As of build 22567, the version string has been changed from "Dev" to "22H2".

The update began rolling out on September 20, 2022. Notable changes in the 2022 Update include:

- Redesigned and new Efficiency Mode feature accessible via Task Manager
- Re-added the drag and drop feature on the taskbar
- Improvement to the snap layout experience
- New live captions feature
- New Smart App Control (SAC) feature for blocking untrusted applications
- Split "Focus assist" feature into "Do not disturb" and "Focus"
- Included Clipchamp as inbox app

The first component update to Windows 11, version 22H2, codenamed "Moment 1", was released on October 18, 2022, with build 22621.675 and several further changes:

- New tabbed browsing feature and refreshed layout of the left navigation pane in the File Explorer
- New inline suggested actions feature
- Re-introduced taskbar overflow feature
- Improvements to the built-in Windows share window
- Added support of Auto Color Management (ACM) which further optimized for OLED and/or wide-color gamut monitors by reading DisplayID data
- Added support of Variable Refresh Rate (VRR) by reading DisplayID data

The second component update to Windows 11, version 22H2, codenamed "Moment 2", was released on February 28, 2023, with build 22621.1344 and several further changes:

- Added iOS support in the Phone Link app
- New Studio Effects section in the Quick Settings for NPU-compatible devices
- Redesigned Quick Assist app
- Added third-party apps support in the Widgets panel
- Re-introduced tablet-optimized taskbar
- Added support for tabs in the Notepad app
- New Braille displays and input/output languages support in Narrator
- New Energy Recommendations page in the Settings app
- Updated touch keyboard option in the Settings app
- New Tamil Anjal keyboard
- Re-introduced the search box on the taskbar

The third component update to Windows 11, version 22H2, codenamed "Moment 3", was released on May 24, 2023, with build 22621.1778 and several further changes:

- New presence sensor privacy settings in the Settings app
- New VPN icon on the taskbar
- Added the ability to show a notification badge on the Start menu's user profile icon
- Introduced live captions in more languages
- Added the ability to create live kernel memory dumps in Task Manager
- Introduced Content Adaptive Brightness Control (CABC) to desktop computers and battery powered devices
- New copy button for copying two-factor authentication codes in notification toasts
- New USB4 hubs and devices page in the Settings app
- Re-introduced the new touch keyboard option in the Settings app
- New multi-app kiosk mode
- Re-introduced the ability to display seconds in the system clock on the taskbar
- Adds support for Bluetooth LE Audio and the LC3 codec

The fourth component update to Windows 11, version 22H2, codenamed "Moment 4", was released on September 26, 2023, with build 22621.2361 and several further changes:

- The availability of Copilot in Windows (in preview)
- New preview flyout when hovering over files under the Recommended section on the Start menu
- New volume mixer experience in Quick Settings
- Re-introduced the ability to never combine taskbar buttons
- Added the ability to hide the time and date in the system tray
- Updated notification bell icon in the system tray on the taskbar
- Modernized Details pane, Home page, address bar and search box in the File Explorer
- New Gallery feature in File Explorer
- Added the native support of additional archive file formats (7z, rar, tar)
- New Windows Backup app
- New screen for restoring from backup during the OOBE
- Improvements to backup and restore experience for desktop apps
- Added support of Unicode Emoji 15.0
- Added support of COLRv1 color format
- New Narrator natural voices in Simplified Chinese, Spanish (Spain and Mexico), Japanese, English (United Kingdom and India), French, Portuguese, German and Korean
- New text authoring experiences in voice access
- New Home page in the Settings app
- Redesigned Windows Security notification dialogs

The fifth component update to Windows 11, version 22H2, codenamed "Moment 5", was released on February 29, 2024, with build 22621.3235.

The update has reached end of service on October 8, 2024 for Home, Pro, Pro Education, Pro for Workstations and SE editions. The Enterprise, Enterprise multi-session, IoT Enterprise and Education editions have reached end of service on October 14, 2025.

=== Version 23H2 (2023 Update) ===
The Windows 11 2023 Update (also known as version 23H2 and codenamed "Sun Valley 3") is the second major update to Windows 11. It was shipped as an enablement package for the Windows 11 2022 Update, and carries the build number 10.0.22631.

Major features of Windows 11 2023 Update and system applications included:

- Windows Cortana was replaced with Windows Copilot, later rebranded as Microsoft Copilot, an AI assistant based on the same technology stack as Bing Chat and Microsoft 365 Copilot.
- Windows Backup was re-introduced with a new look and feature set for Windows 11.
- Passkey support on the OS level was implemented via the biometric Windows Hello system.
- The Start Menu, All Apps section now shows a new "System" label for system apps, which are managed via the Settings app, System category, System Components section.
- Wake on Approach, Lock on Leave, and Adaptive Dimming features introduced to reduce energy use.
- Paint received layer support and AI-based tools for digital creation.
- Snipping Tool received AI-based tools to extract text from screenshots.
- Photos received AI-based tools for subject detection to automatically add background blur to photos.
- Clipchamp received an AI-based Auto Compose tool.
- Chat was changed to Microsoft Teams, which is automatically pinned to the taskbar.
- Voice Access was improved to reach more places, such as login. It now also supports more complex words.
- Narrator was improved to support more languages.

Final minor version of Windows to unofficially support processors that don't meet the x86-x64-v2 (i.e., having POPCNT and SSE4.2) or ARMv8.1 specifications.

The first preview was released to Insiders who opted in to the Beta Channel on May 25, 2023. The update began rolling out on October 31, 2023. New features and changes from "Moment 4" were enabled by default in this update. The version string was changed from "22H2" to "23H2" in build 25375.

The first component update to Windows 11, version 23H2, codenamed "Moment 5", was released on February 29, 2024, with build 22631.3235 and several further changes:

- Improvements to Copilot in Windows
- Improvements to voice access
  - New voice access in French, German, and Spanish
  - Added multi-display support
  - New voice shortcuts feature
- Enhanced image consumption experience in Narrator
- New share targets for sharing links through the Windows share window
- Updates to the Cast flyout in Quick Settings
- New suggestions feature in snap layouts
- Improvements to Windows 365 Boot and Windows 365 Switch
- New notification for prompting to open recent photos and screenshots from Android mobile device in Snipping Tool

This is the last version of Windows 11 where the DNS Cache Service DNScache is used as an optional service. This behavior was changed on version 24H2 onwards, where the DNS Cache Service is now mandatory to access the Internet thus if disabled, the system will not be able to access the internet anymore.

The update has reached end of service on November 11, 2025 for Home, Pro, Pro Education, Pro for Workstations and SE editions. The Enterprise, Enterprise multi-session, IoT Enterprise and Education editions have reached end of service on November 10, 2026.

=== Version 24H2 (2024 Update) ===
The Windows 11 2024 Update (also known as version 24H2 and codenamed "Hudson Valley") is the third major update to Windows 11. It carries the build number 10.0.26100.

The first preview was released to Insiders who opted into the Canary and Dev Channels on February 8, 2024. The update began rolling out for Copilot+ PCs on June 15, 2024. As of build 26052, the version string has been changed from "23H2" to "24H2". The update began rolling out to all users on October 1, 2024.

The update notably introduces the first Windows 11 based Long-Term Servicing Channel (LTSC) editions, along with new subscription variants of IoT Enterprise editions (both LTSC and non-LTSC).

For the first time since the release of Windows 11, version 24H2 introduces modified system requirements:

- A x86-64-v2 CPU supporting SSE4.2 and POPCNT CPU instructions is now required, otherwise the Windows kernel is unbootable. (Only affecting systems bypassing the requirements, along with all 24H2 IoT Enterprise editions.)
- IoT Enterprise editions (LTSC and non-LTSC) have officially eliminated a TPM and UEFI requirement, and lowers the minimum DirectX version to 10 from 12, which was previously required on 23H2.
- The new IoT Enterprise LTSC edition lowers the minimum required RAM to 2 GB, and storage space to 16 GB.
- ARMv8.1 is now required for ARM variants, dropping unofficial support for ARMv8.0. On ARMv8.0 CPUs, the Windows kernel is unbootable.
- ARM variants drop support for 32-bit ARM applications. Only 64-bit ARM applications will run.

Windows 11, version 24H2, notably, has a longer than usual list of known issues; some require updated drivers to fix, while others have yet to be fixed as of February 2025. E.g., broken biometrics and camera support on a limited number of devices, and some older games and applications not functioning properly or not working at all; e.g., Asphalt 8 (resolved since March 19, 2025), Dirac audio improvement software (if cridspapo.dll is utilized), and AutoCAD 2022.

New features include:

- Windows 11 HDR background support for HDR monitors
- Support for Wi-Fi 7 (802.11be), which enhances data transfer speeds, along with new user interface elements to refresh the list of Wi-Fi networks and indicate scan progress
- Support for Bluetooth LE audio
- Support for aptX Adaptive wireless audio (compatible Qualcomm Wi-Fi and Bluetooth controller required).
- Windows 11 Search adds the ability to search for documents and photos using descriptive phrases instead of just file names
- Auto Super Resolution boosts frame rates for certain games while maintaining visual quality; requires a Copilot+ PC with a Snapdragon X processor
- Windows Recall (preview) which lets users find content they have already viewed. Delayed and only being released in preview status due to the amount of negative feedback that it received when it was first introduced, this feature requires Windows Hello for secure access (because it may display sensitive data) and can be disabled.
- Windows Studio Effects for cameras and microphones in supported applications including Microsoft Teams, Zoom, Google Meet, Skype, and the Microsoft Camera app; effects include backdrop blur, eye correction, portrait lighting, and illustrative filters
- Windows Click to Do (preview): an interactive PC screen overlay with several functions for tasks including text summarizing or sending, blending backgrounds in pictures, and using Microsoft Bing for visual search

Dropped features include:

- Ability to disable DNS Cache Service due to the fact that this service is mandatory to access the internet like opening a webpage through a browser, even though ping requests still works when dnscache is disabled, for practical purposes the system will lose internet access completely, thus making standard navigation impossible.

The update has reached end of service on October 13, 2026, for Home, Pro, Pro Education and Pro for Workstations editions. The update is also the last to be available to the SE edition, which will reach end of support alongside consumer editions. The Enterprise, Enterprise multi-session, IoT Enterprise and Education editions will reach end of service on October 12, 2027. The Enterprise LTSC and IoT Enterprise LTSC editions will reach end of service on October 9, 2029, and October 10, 2034, respectively.

=== Version 25H2 (2025 Update) ===
The Windows 11 2025 Update (also known as version 25H2) is the fourth major update to Windows 11. It is shipped as an enablement package for the Windows 11 2024 Update, and carries the build number 10.0.26200.

The first preview was released to Insiders who opted in to the Dev Channel on June 27, 2025, along with the version string being changed from "24H2" to "25H2". The update began rolling out on September 30, 2025.

The KB5094126 update broke the recycle bin dialogs, OneDrive and PC stability.

=== Version 26H1 ===
Windows 11, version 26H1 is the fifth major update to Windows 11 for ARM64 devices. It was released on February 10, 2026.

The first preview was released to Insiders who opted in to the Canary Channel on November 7, 2025, along with the version string being changed from "Dev" to "26H1".

Version 26H1 is a platform-specific support release that only includes changes to support devices with certain ARM processors, with the Qualcomm Snapdragon X2 being one of the confirmed devices as of March 25, 2026.

=== Version 26H2 (2026 Update) ===
The Windows 11 2026 Update (also known as version 26H2) is the sixth and latest major update to Windows 11. It will be shipped as an enablement package for the Windows 11 2025 Update alongside version 26H1, and carry the build number 10.0.26300.

This update primarily focuses on user interface improvements, including:

- Porting the ability to move the taskbar location and the small taskbar feature from Windows 10 and earlier.
- Reducing the integration of Microsoft Copilot within the system.
- Upgrading certain legacy interfaces to WinUI to improve stability.
- Optimizing File Explorer for better performance and speed.
- Optimizing for PCs with 8 GB memory.

== Insider releases ==
Windows Insider Preview builds are delivered to Insiders in four different channels. Insiders in the Dev and Canary Channel receive updates prior to those in the Beta Channel but might experience more bugs and other issues. Insiders in the Release Preview Channel do not receive updates until the version is almost available to the public but are comparatively more stable.

On February 3, 2022, Microsoft changed its plans on how they delivered builds for Windows Insiders, with Dev and Beta Channels being "parallel" active development branches, giving an option to switch from Dev to Beta Channel for a limited time. The Dev Channel builds are meant for upcoming and experimental features that may never release to general availability, whereas the Beta Channel builds are the "feature complete" builds that will make its way to the general availability for the specific Windows 11 release.

On March 6, 2023, Microsoft announced that it was restructuring the preview channels in the Windows Insider Program. The Dev Channel would continue to test early versions of new features, and existing insiders were moved to the new Canary Channel that would primarily test changes to the kernel.

== See also ==
- Windows 10 version history
- Xbox OS version history
