= Menu key =

Button on Windows-oriented computer keyboards

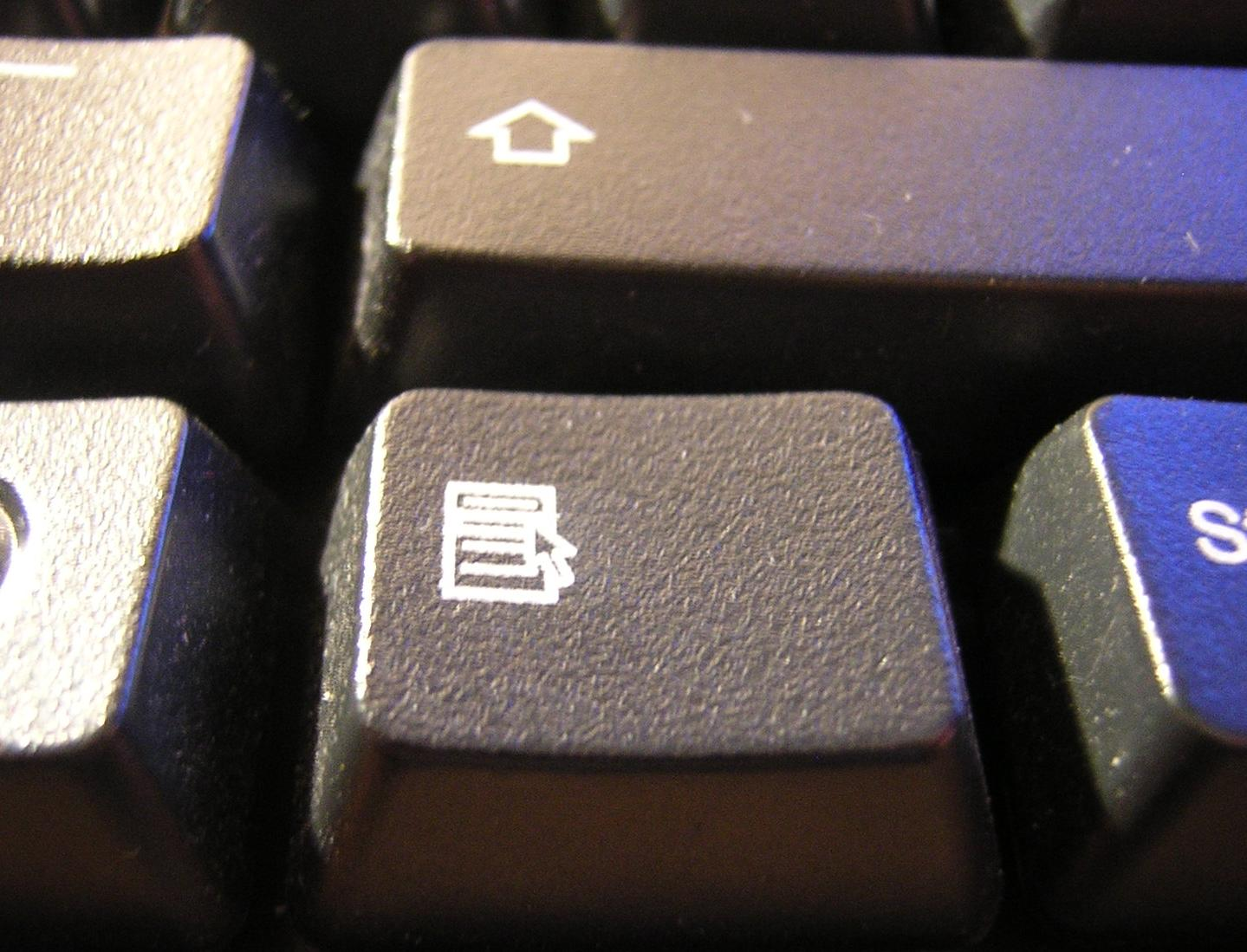
The Menu key

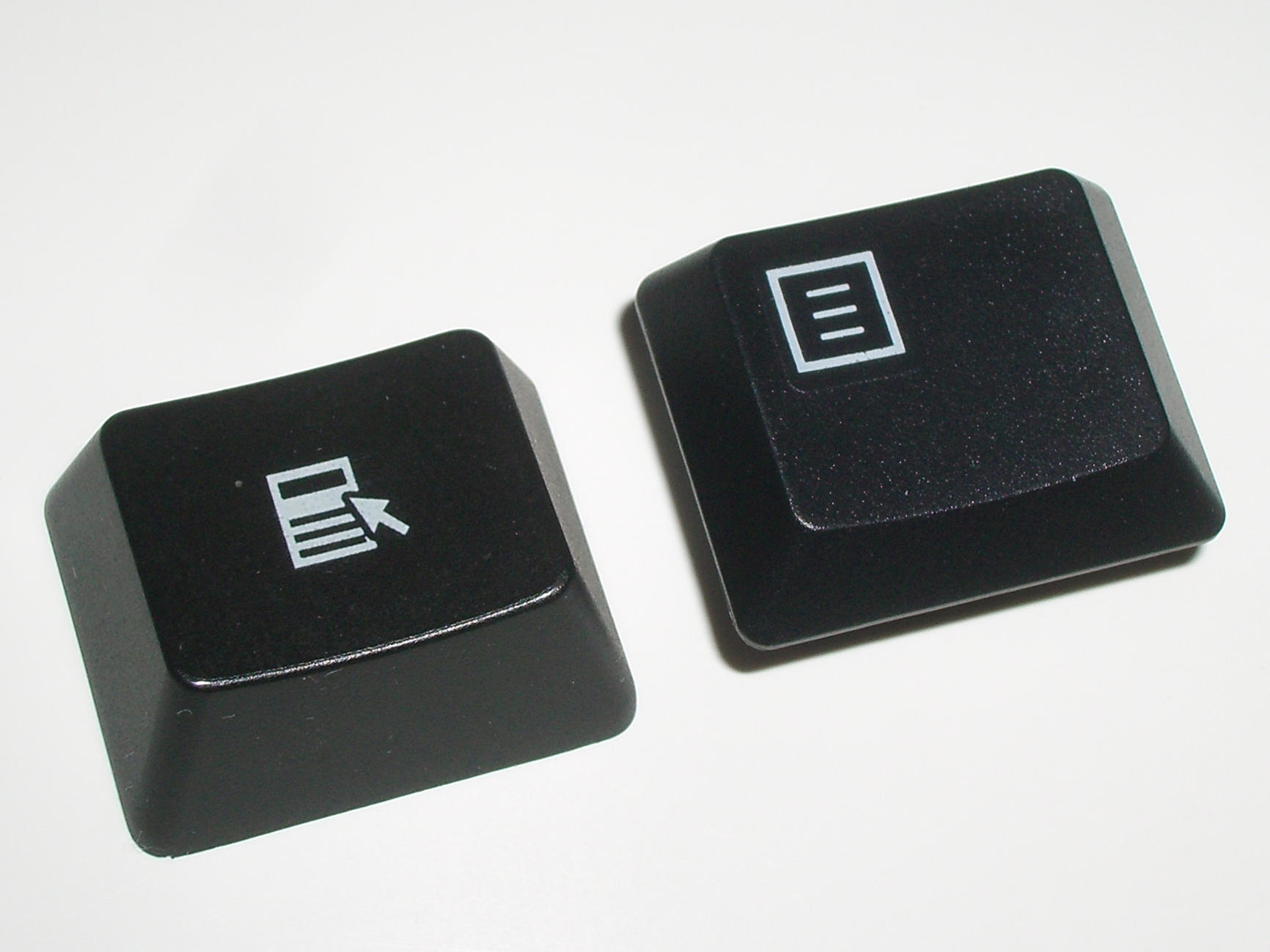
Two different keycap versions

In computing, the menu key (≣ Menu), or application key, is a key with the primary function to launch a context menu with the keyboard rather than with the usual right-mouse button. It was previously found on Microsoft Windows-oriented computer keyboards and was introduced in 1994, at the same time as the Windows logo key. The menu key was sometimes omitted on smaller keyboards.

In October 2024, Apple added the "Contextual Menu key" to its USB-C Magic Keyboard with Touch ID and Numeric Keypad models.

== Implementation ==
On keyboards including the key, its symbol would usually have been a small icon depicting a pointer hovering above a menu; it would typically have been found on the right side of the keyboard between the right Windows logo key and the right control key (or between the right AltGr key and the right control key). While the Windows key is present on the vast majority of keyboards intended for use with the Windows operating system, the menu key was frequently omitted in the interest of space, particularly on portable and laptop keyboards.

It was able to be used when the right-mouse button was not present on a mouse.

Some Windows public terminals did not have a Menu key on their keyboard with the goal of preventing users from right-clicking; however, in many Windows applications, a similar functionality could be invoked with the ⇧ Shift+F10 keyboard shortcut, or sometimes Ctrl+⇧ Shift+F10.

== Other hardware ==
Some laptop computers include a menu function on the fn key (usually operated by typing ⇧ Shift+Fn), however, this generally invokes functions built into the vendor's software and is not the same as the key described above. For example, the Logitech Illuminated Keyboard has an FN key where the menu key is usually found; pressing FN, together with the keyboard's print screen key (above home), produces the Menu key function.

Android devices formerly came with physical menu buttons, but with the 2011 release of Android Honeycomb, this was deprecated in favor of an on-screen button.

== Copilot key ==
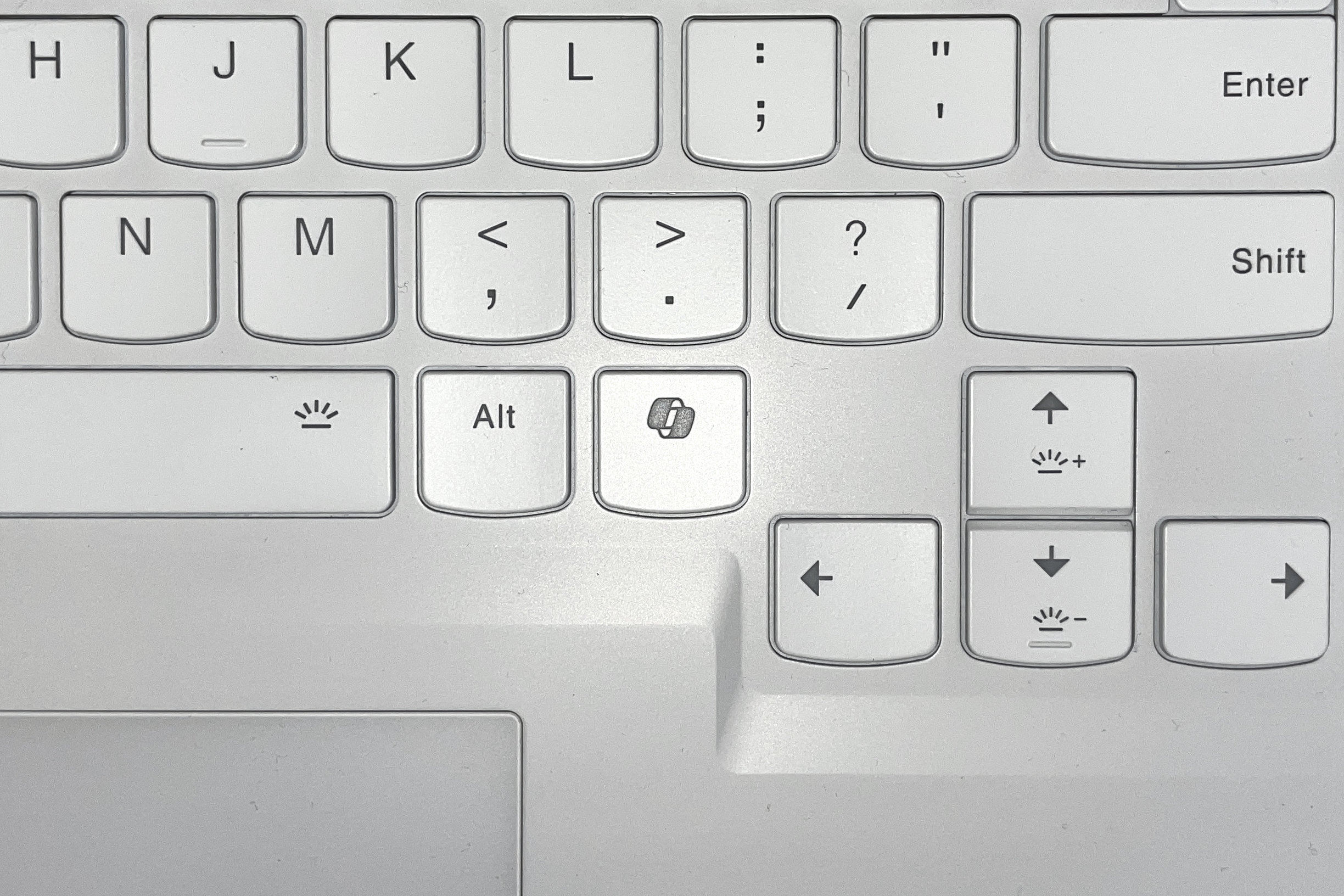
Copilot key (at center) on a Lenovo Legion 7i laptop. Starting in 2024, this key replaces the menu key for licensed Windows-compatible keyboards.

In January 2024, Microsoft announced a Microsoft Copilot key that would replace the menu key on devices branded as "Copilot+" PCs. If Copilot is disabled or not available in a user's market, this key would launch Windows Search.

== See also ==
- Hamburger button
- Win key
