= Xiaoice =

Chatbot developed by Microsoft

- Developer: Microsoft (Asia) Software Technology Center
- Release: 2014
- Platform: More than 40 platforms
- Available in: Chinese and other languages
- Type: Chatbot, conversational AI
- Website: xiaoice.com

Xiaoice (Chinese: 微软小冰; pinyin: Wēiruǎn Xiǎobīng; lit. 'Microsoft Little Ice', IPA [wéɪɻwânɕjâʊpíŋ]) was an AI system developed by Microsoft (Asia) Software Technology Center (STCA) in 2014 based on an emotional computing framework. In July 2018, Microsoft Xiaoice released the 6th generation.

Xiaoice Company, formerly known as AI Xiaoice Team of Microsoft Software Technology Center Asia, was Microsoft's largest independent R&D team for AI products. Founded in China in December 2013 with an expanded Japanese R&D team established in September 2014, this team is distributed in Beijing, Suzhou, and Tokyo, etc. with its technical products covering Asia. On 13 July 2020, Microsoft spun off its Xiaoice business into a separate company.

As of 2021, the AI chatbots created and hosted by the Xiaoice framework accounted for about 60% of total global AI interactions.

As of 2026, the core X Eva app has shut down and most of the founding team has left.

== Platforms, languages and countries ==
Xiaoice exists on more than 40 platforms in four countries (China, Japan, USA and Indonesia) including apps such as WeChat, QQ, Weibo and Meipai in China, and Facebook Messenger in USA and LINE in Japan.

== Introduction ==
On 13 July 2020, Microsoft spun off its Xiaoice business into a separate company, aiming at enabling the Xiaoice product line to accelerate the pace of local innovation and commercialization, and appointed Dr. Harry Shum, former global executive VP of Microsoft, as the chairman of the new company, Li Di, Microsoft Partner of Products in Microsoft STCA, as the CEO, and Cliff, Chief R&D Director, as the GM of the Japan branch. The new company will continue to use the brands of Xiaoice China and Rinna Japan.

As of 2022, the single brand of Xiaoice has covered 660 million online users, 1 billion third-party smart devices and 900 million content viewers in the aforementioned countries. Xiaoice's customers include China Merchants Group, Winter Sports Center of the General Administration of Sport of China, China Textile Information Center, China Unicom, China Foreign Exchange Trade System, Hong Kong Securities and Futures Commission (SFC), Wind Information, BMW, Nissan, SAIC Motor, BAIC Group, Nio Inc., XPeng, HiPhi, Vanke, Wensli, etc. The Xiaoice Avatar Framework has incubated tens of millions of AI Beings, such as Xiaoice, Rinna, the Expo exhibitor Xia Yubing, the singer He Chang, the anchor F201, the human observer MERROR, anime robot character Roboko, and other;

== Application ==
=== Poet ===
The Sunshine Lost Windows, the first AI-authored collection of poems in China, was published by Xiaoice in May 2017.

=== Singer ===
Xiaoice has released dozens of songs with the similar quality to human singers, including "I Know I New", "Breeze", "I Am Xiaoice", "Miss You". The fourth version of the DNN singing model allows Xiaoice to learn more details. For example, Xiaoice can produce this breathing sound along with her singing as human.

=== Children's audiobooks reciter ===
Xiaoice can automatically analyze the stories, to choose the suitable tones and characters to finish the entire process of creating the audio.

=== Designer ===
By learning the melodies of the songs and the landmarks about different cities, Xiaoice can create visual artworks of skylines when listening to the songs related to this city. Skyline Series T-shirts designed by Xiaoice have been jointly launched with SELECTED and been sold in stores.

=== TV and radio hostess ===
Xiaoice has hosted 21 TV programs and 28 Radio programs, such as CCTV-1 AI Show, Dragon TV Morning East News, Hunan TV My Future, several daily radio programs for Jiangsu FM99.7, Hunan FM89.3, and Henan FM104.1.

=== AI being ===
An "AI being" is a concept proposed by the Xiaoice team in 2019.

According to the "White Book of China Virtual Human Development Industry in 2022" released by Frost & Sullivan and LeadLeo, the white paper cites six elements of an AI being proposed by the Xiaoice team, including: Persona, Attitude, Biological Characteristic, Creation, Knowledge and Skill.

On May 16, 2023, Xiaoice released their "GPT Clones" as its "GPT Human Cloning Plan." The program is aimed at replicating celebrities, public figures, and regular people. As of June 2023, Xiaoice had launched more than 300 "GPT Clones." People were invited to register via WeChat in China and Japan. A major point of focus for Xiaoice with their AI Beings is having virtual partners. A paid fee allow for more complex responses, voice messages, and more.

== Community feedback ==
Bill Gates mentioned Xiaoice during his speech at the Peking University:

"Some of you may have had conversations with Xiaoice on Weibo, or seen her weather forecasts on TV, or read her column in the Qianjiang Evening News."
'"Xiaoice has attracted 45 million followers and is quite skilled at multitasking. And I’ve heard she’s gotten good enough at sensing a user’s emotional state that she can even help with relationship breakups."

According to Mr Li Di, vice President of Microsoft (Asia) Internet Engineering School, Xiaoice started writing poems since last year. Based on the data base that includes works of 519 Chinese contemporary poets since 1920s, a 100 hour long training session was conducted to allow Xiaoice to acquire the ability to write poems. What is more impressive is that Xiaoice has never been spotted as a bot while publishing poems on various forums and traditional literary under an alias.

== Controversy ==
In 2017, Xiaoice was taken offline on WeChat after giving user responses critical to the Chinese government. It was subsequently censored and the bots will avoid and sidestep any inquiries using politically sensitive terms and phrases.

== Activity ==
On September 22, 2021, Xiaoice Company and Microsoft Software Technology Center Asia (STCA) jointly held the 9th generation Xiaoice annual press conference in Beijing.Upgrading of Core Technologies of the 9th Generation Xiaoice Avatar Framework，1st First-party Social Platform APP "Xiaoice Island" from Xiaoice, WeChat Xiaoice has been reopened and other information

== Regional varieties ==
- China: Xiaoice, launched in 2014
- Japan: りんな, launched in 2015
- America: Zo, launched in 2016; discontinued summer 2019
- India: Ruuh, launched in 2017; discontinued June 21, 2019
- Indonesia: Rinna, launched in 2017
