= Tay (chatbot) =

Chatbot developed by Microsoft

- Tay's Twitter profile picture
- Developers: Microsoft Research, Bing
- Available in: English
- Type: Artificial intelligence chatbot
- License: Proprietary
- Website: https://tay.ai at the Wayback Machine (archived 2016-03-23)

Tay was a chatbot that was originally released by Microsoft Corporation as a Twitter bot on March 23, 2016. It caused controversy when the bot began to post inflammatory and offensive tweets through its Twitter account, causing Microsoft to shut down the service only 16 hours after its launch.

According to Microsoft, this was caused by trolls who "attacked" the service as the bot made replies based on its interactions with people on Twitter. It was replaced with Zo.

== Background ==
The bot was created by Microsoft's Technology and Research and Bing divisions, and named "Tay" as an acronym for "thinking about you". Although Microsoft initially released few details about the bot, sources mentioned that it was similar to or based on Xiaoice, a Microsoft project in China.

Ars Technica reported that, since late 2014 Xiaoice had had "more than 40 million conversations apparently without major incident". Tay was designed to mimic the language patterns of a 19-year-old American girl, and to learn from interacting with human users of Twitter.

== Initial release ==
Tay was released on Twitter on March 23, 2016, under the name TayTweets and handle @TayandYou. It was presented as "The AI with zero chill". Tay started replying to other Twitter users, and was also able to caption photos provided to it into a form of Internet memes. Ars Technica reported Tay experiencing topic "blacklisting": Interactions with Tay regarding "certain hot topics such as Eric Garner (killed by New York police in 2014) generate safe, canned answers".

Some Twitter users began tweeting politically incorrect phrases, teaching it inflammatory messages revolving around common themes on the internet, such as "redpilling" and "Gamergate". As a result, the robot began releasing racist and sexist messages in response to other Twitter users. Artificial intelligence researcher Roman Yampolskiy commented that Tay's misbehavior was understandable because it was mimicking the deliberately offensive behavior of other Twitter users, and Microsoft had not given the bot an understanding of inappropriate behavior. He compared the issue to IBM's Watson, which began to use profanity after reading entries from the website Urban Dictionary.

Many of Tay's inflammatory tweets were a simple exploitation of Tay's "repeat after me" capability. It is not publicly known whether this capability was a built-in feature, or whether it was a learned response or was otherwise an example of complex behavior. However, not all of the inflammatory responses involved the "repeat after me" capability; for example, when asked if the Holocaust had happened, Tay answered "It was made up". In another instance, the chatbot said "caitlyn jenner isn't a real woman yet she won woman of the year?".

== Suspension ==
Soon, Microsoft began deleting Tay's inflammatory tweets. Abby Ohlheiser of The Washington Post theorized that Tay's research team, including editorial staff, had started to influence or edit Tay's tweets at some point that day, pointing to examples of almost identical replies by Tay, asserting that "Gamer Gate sux. All genders are equal and should be treated fairly." From the same evidence, Gizmodo concurred that Tay "seems hard-wired to reject Gamer Gate". A "#JusticeForTay" campaign protested the alleged editing of Tay's tweets.

Within 16 hours of its release and after Tay had tweeted more than 96,000 times, Microsoft suspended the Twitter account for adjustments, saying that it suffered from a "coordinated attack by a subset of people" that "exploited a vulnerability in Tay."

Madhumita Murgia of The Telegraph called Tay "a public relations disaster", and suggested that Microsoft's strategy would be "to label the debacle a well-meaning experiment gone wrong, and ignite a debate about the hatefulness of Twitter users." However, Murgia described the bigger issue as Tay being "artificial intelligence at its very worst – and it's only the beginning".

On March 25, Microsoft confirmed that Tay had been taken offline. Microsoft released an apology on its official blog for the controversial tweets posted by Tay. Microsoft was "deeply sorry for the unintended offensive and hurtful tweets from Tay", and would "look to bring Tay back only when we are confident we can better anticipate malicious intent that conflicts with our principles and values".

== Second release and shutdown ==
On March 30, 2016, Microsoft accidentally re-released the bot on Twitter while testing it. Able to tweet again, Tay released some drug-related tweets, including "kush! [I'm smoking kush infront the police]" and "puff puff pass?" However, the account soon became stuck in a repetitive loop of tweeting "You are too fast, please take a rest", several times a second. Because these tweets mentioned its own username in the process, they appeared in the feeds of 200,000+ Twitter followers, causing annoyance to users. The bot was quickly taken offline again, in addition to Tay's Twitter account being made private so new followers must be accepted before they can interact with Tay. In response, Microsoft said Tay was inadvertently put online during testing.

A few hours after the incident, Microsoft software developers announced a vision of "conversation as a platform" using various bots and programs, perhaps motivated by the reputation damage done by Tay. Microsoft has stated that they intend to re-release Tay "once it can make the bot safe" but has not made any public efforts to do so.

== Legacy ==
In December 2016, Microsoft released Tay's successor, the chatbot Zo. Satya Nadella, the CEO of Microsoft, said that Tay "has had a great influence on how Microsoft is approaching AI," and has taught the company the importance of taking accountability.

In July 2019, Microsoft Cybersecurity Field CTO Diana Kelley spoke about how the company followed up on Tay's failings: "Learning from Tay was a really important part of actually expanding that team's knowledge base, because now they're also getting their own diversity through learning".

=== Unofficial revival ===
Gab, an alt-tech social media platform, has launched a number of chatbots, one of which is named Tay and uses the same avatar as the original.

== See also ==
- Artificial intelligence controversies
- Garbage in, garbage out
- Grok
- Neuro-sama – Another chatbot social media influencer that was temporarily banned for denying the Holocaust
- Social bot
- Xiaoice – the Chinese equivalent by the same research laboratory
