= Windows Recall =

AI-powered feature of Windows 11

Windows Recall is an AI-powered feature of Windows 11 intended to help users remember anything they do on their PC at any time and potentially resume or investigate it later. Users can query the AI through natural language. This feature has a rigid set of system requirements, including a 40-trillion-operations-per-second neural processing unit (NPU), and device-level cryptography. The feature has met significant backlash.

== Overview ==
Windows Recall takes a screenshot of a user's desktop every few seconds, then uses on-device large language models to allow a user to retrieve items and information that had previously been on their screen. It was announced by Microsoft, alongside the integration of GPT-4o into Microsoft Copilot and an upgraded user interface in Windows 11, in May 2024.

Systems using Recall must meet the following requirements:

- A Copilot+ PC that meets the Secured-core standard
- A neural processing unit (NPU) capable of 40 TOPS
- 16 GB RAM
- 8 logical processors
- 256 GB storage capacity, with 50 GB of free space (saving snapshots automatically pauses if the device has less than 25 GB of free storage space)
- BitLocker Device Encryption enabled
- Windows Hello Enhanced Sign-in Security enabled, with at least one biometric sign-in option

== Reception ==
Microsoft announced Recall during Build conference in May 2024 claiming that Recall stores all user (index) data locally and encrypted. Shortly after announcement, security experts criticized lack of an option to disable the feature. In early June, a simple script tool called Total Recall demonstrated a bypass of Windows Recall security stealing all local data (which was stored unencrypted). Shortly after, Microsoft pledged to rework Windows Recall to address demonstrated weaknesses. Originally Microsoft planned to sidestep testing Recall in Microsoft Insiders program to ship Recall on Copilot Plus PC program launch on June 18. On June 13, 2024, tech media reported that Microsoft engineers struggled to secure Recall by the original deadline, prompting Microsoft on June 14 to delay release and to do more testing in Windows Insiders release channel. In early September 2024, Recall appeared among optional Windows 11 features allowing users to uninstall it, but Microsoft promptly claimed that this ability is a bug. Later the same month, via a blog post Microsoft announced a "more secure" version of Recall with full database encryption and the ability to be uninstalled. Microsoft then changed the feature to opt-in and provided instructions for how to remove it.

In May 2025, the secure messaging app Signal added a new "screen security" function to its Windows client, which uses digital rights management to prevent the program from being visible to Recall or any other screen capture tools; this feature is enabled by default for all Windows 11 users. Signal's developers explicitly cited Recall as an impetus for the feature, arguing that software developers "shouldn't have to implement 'one weird trick' in order to maintain the privacy and integrity of their services without proper developer tools. People who care about privacy shouldn't be forced to sacrifice accessibility upon the altar of AI aspirations either." Brave and AdGuard added similar functionality in July 2025.
