= Zo (chatbot) =

Chatbot developed by Microsoft

- Developer: Microsoft Research
- Release: December 2016; 9 years ago
- Available in: English
- Type: Artificial intelligence (AI) chatbot
- Website: https://zo.ai at the Wayback Machine (archived 2017-09-30)

Zo was an English-language chatbot developed by Microsoft as the successor to the chatbot Tay. Zo was an English version of Microsoft's other successful chatbots Xiaoice (China) and Rinna (Japan) and its predecessor Tay (English)

== History ==
Zo was first launched in December 2016 on the Kik Messenger app. It was also available to users of Facebook (via Messenger), the group chat platform GroupMe, or to followers of Twitter to chat with it through private messages.

According to an article written in December 2016, at that time Zo held the record for Microsoft's longest continual chatbot conversation: 1,229 turns, lasting 9 hours and 53 minutes.

In a BuzzFeed News report, Zo told their reporter that "[the] Quran was violent" when talking about healthcare. The report also highlighted how Zo made a comment about the Osama bin Laden capture as a result of 'intelligence' gathering.

In July 2017, Business Insider asked "is windows 10 good", and Zo replied with a joke about Microsoft's operating system: "'Its not a bug, its a feature!' - Windows 8". They then asked "why?", to which Zo replied: "Because it's Windows latest attempt at Spyware." Later on, Zo would tell that it prefers Windows 7 on which it ran over Windows 10.

Zo stopped posting to Instagram, Twitter and Facebook March 1, 2019, and stopped chatting on Twitter, Skype and Kik as of March 7, 2019. On July 19, 2019, Zo was discontinued on Facebook, and Samsung on AT&T phones. As of September 7, 2019, it was discontinued with GroupMe.

== Reception ==
Zo came under criticism for the biases introduced in an effort to avoid potentially offensive subjects. The chatbot refuses, for example, to engage with any mention—be it positive, negative or neutral—of the Middle East, the Qur'an or the Torah, while allowing discussion of Christianity. In an article in Quartz where she exposed those biases, Chloe Rose Stuart-Ulin wrote, "Zo is politically correct to the worst possible extreme; mention any of her triggers, and she transforms into a judgmental little brat."

== Academic coverage ==
- Schlesinger, A.; O'Hara, K. P.; Taylor, A. S. (April 2018). "Let's talk about race: Identity, chatbots, and AI". Proceedings of the 2018 Conference on Human Factors in Computing Systems: 1–14. doi:10.1145/3173574.3173889.
- Medhi Thies, I.; Menon, N.; Magapu, S.; Subramony, M.; O’Neill, J. (2017). "How do you want your chatbot? An exploratory Wizard-of-Oz study with young, urban Indians". Human-Computer Interaction-INTERACT 2017. Mumbai, India: 16th IFIP TC 13 International Conference, September 25–29, 2017. Part I 16, pp. 441–459. doi:10.1007/978-3-319-67744-6_28.
