= LK201 =

The LK201 is a detachable computer keyboard introduced by Digital Equipment Corporation of Maynard, Massachusetts in 1982. It was first used by Digital's VT220 ANSI/ASCII terminal and was subsequently used by the Rainbow-100, DECmate-II, and Pro-350 microcomputers and many of Digital's computer workstations such as the VAXstation and DECstation families.

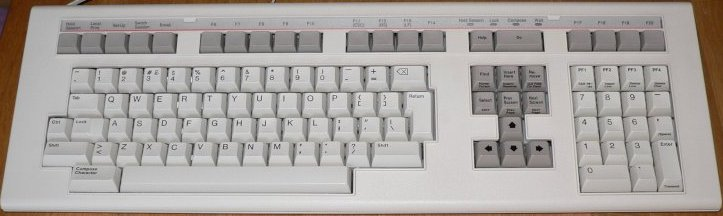

The keyboard layout was new at the time, adding a set of cursor and miscellaneous keys between the main keyboard and the numeric keypad. The cursor keys were arranged in what has now become the standard "Inverted T" arrangement seen on essentially all contemporary full-sized computer keyboards. The keyboard also added a Compose key to allow typing of all of the characters in the terminal's extended character set using two-stroke mnemonics, for instance Composeu" produced ü. An LED on the keyboard indicated an ongoing compose sequence.

Ergonomic considerations caused the keyboard to be designed with a very low profile; it was very thin, especially when compared to the keyboard used on the VT100. The keyboard connected using a 4 position modular connector over which flowed 12 volt power and 4800 bit/s asynchronous serial data.

At the time of its introduction, the differences between the new layout and the traditional Teletype Model 33 and VT100 layouts proved disruptive, but the LK201's key arrangement was emulated by the even more successful Model M keyboard and through it became the de facto standard for all full-sized computer keyboards. Today's standard layout differs primarily in the restoration of the Escape Key found on the VT100 and that the numeric keypad has two double-height keys instead of one, decreasing the number pad keys from 18 to 17. The VT220 Compose key would survive in the European ISO standard but not in the U.S. ANSI standard.

Follow-on keyboards from Digital refined the design introduced with the LK201. One notable departure from the basic LK201 design was a Unix-oriented keyboard, the LK421, that omitted the added middle group of cursor and miscellaneous function keys but included a dedicated Escape Key. Many Unix users preferred a narrower, ASCII-oriented keyboard rather than the rather-wide LK201 arrangement and the Escape Key was essential for several popular Unix editors.
