= DEC Professional =

PDP-11-based personal computer (1982)

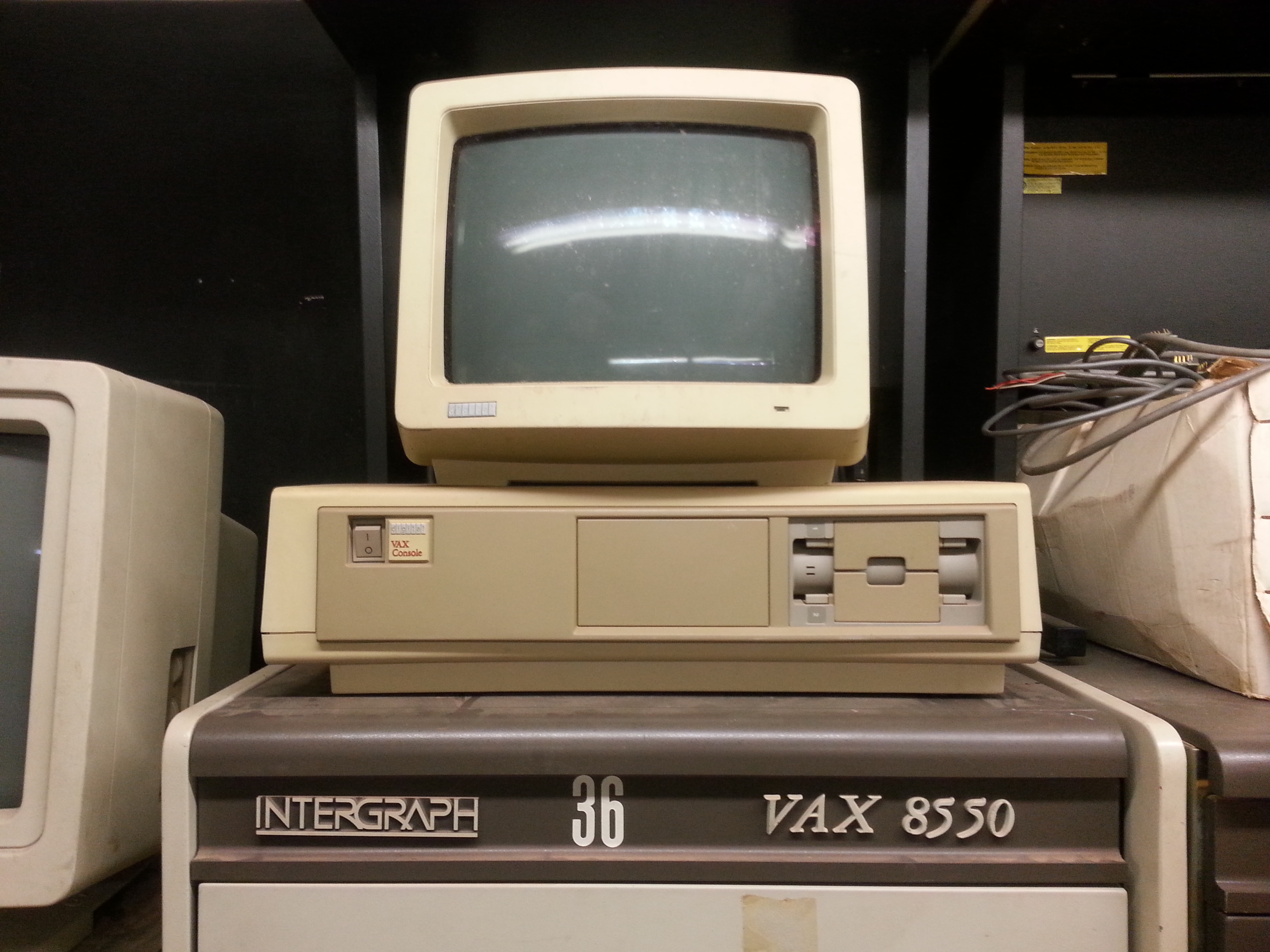
- A DEC Professional used as a console for a VAX 8550
- Developer: Digital Equipment Corporation
- Product family: Programmed Data Processor
- Type: Microcomputer
- Released: 1982; 44 years ago
- Operating system: P/OS, RT-11, Venix, 2.9BSD Unix
- Input: LK201 keyboard
- Platform: DEC 16-bit

The Professional 325 (PRO-325), Professional 350 (PRO-350), and Professional 380 (PRO-380) are microcomputers based on the PDP-11 architecture. The Pro-325/350 were introduced in 1982 and the Pro-380 in 1985 by Digital Equipment Corporation (DEC) as high-end competitors to the IBM PC.

== History ==
Like the cosmetically similar Rainbow 100 and DECmate II (also introduced at that time), the PRO series uses the LK201 keyboard and 400KB single-sided quad-density floppy disk drives (known as RX50), and offers a choice of color or monochrome monitors.

For DEC, none of the three would be favorably received, and the industry instead standardized on Intel 8088-based IBM PC compatibles which are all binary program compatible with each other. In some ways, the PDP-11 microprocessors are technically superior to the Intel-based chips. While the 8088 is restricted to 1MB of memory because of its 20-bit address bus, DEC microprocessors are capable of accessing 4MB with their 22-bit addressing (although direct addressing of memory is limited in both approaches to 64KB segments, limiting the size of individual code and data objects). BYTE in 1984 reported that Venix on the PC outperformed the same operating system on the DEC Professional and PDP-11/23.

Further, although the PDP-11 was a very successful minicomputer, it lacked a wide base of affordable small business software. By comparison, many existing CP/M applications (see the Rainbow 100) were easily ported to the similar 8086/8088 chips and MS-DOS operating system. Porting existing PDP-11 software to the PRO was complicated by design decisions that rendered it partially incompatible with its parent product line. Industry critics observed that this incompatibility appeared at least in part deliberate, as DEC belatedly sought to "protect" its more-profitable mainstream PDP-11s from price competition with lower-priced PCs.

The PRO was never widely accepted as an office personal computer, nor as a scientific workstation, where the market was also headed to Intel 8086, or alternately to Motorola 68000-based computers. The failure of DEC to gain a significant foothold in the high-volume PC market would be the beginning of the end of the computer hardware industry in New England, as nearly all computer companies located there were focused on minicomputers for large organizations, from DEC to Data General, Wang, Prime, Computervision, Honeywell, and Symbolics Inc.

== Technical specifications ==
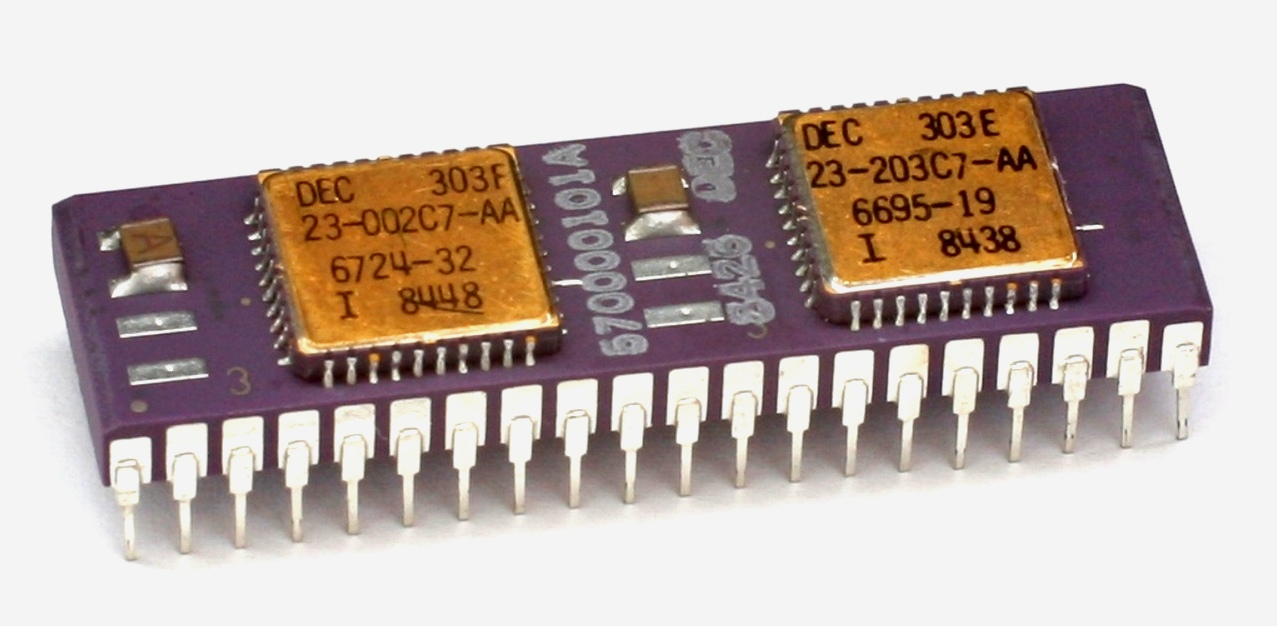
DEC "Fonz-11" (F11) Chipset

The PRO-325 and -350 use the F-11 chipset (as used in LSI-11/23 systems) to create a single-board PDP-11 with up to six expansion slots of a proprietary CTI (Computing Terminal Interconnect) bus using 90-pin ZIF connectors. The PRO family uses dual RX50 floppy drives for storage; the PRO-325 has only floppies, and the 350 and 380 also include an internal hard drive. Mainline PDP-11s generally use separate serial terminals as console and display devices; the PRO family uses built-in bit-mapped graphics to drive a combined console and display.

All other I/O devices in the PRO family are also different (in most cases, radically different) from their counterparts on other PDP-11 models. For example, while the internal bus supports direct memory access (DMA), none of the available I/O devices actually use this feature. The interrupt system is implemented using Intel PC chips of the time, which again makes it very different from the PDP-11 standard interrupt architecture. For all these reasons, support of the PRO family requires extensive modifications to the previously-existing operating system software, and the PRO cannot run standard PDP-11 software without modification.

The default PRO-3xx operating system is DEC's Professional Operating System (P/OS), a modified version of RSX-11M with a menu-driven core user interface. Industry critics complained that this user interface was awkward, slow, and inflexible, offering few advantages over the command-line based MS-DOS user interface that was coming into widespread use.

Other available operating systems include DEC RT-11, VenturCom Venix, and 2.9BSD Unix.

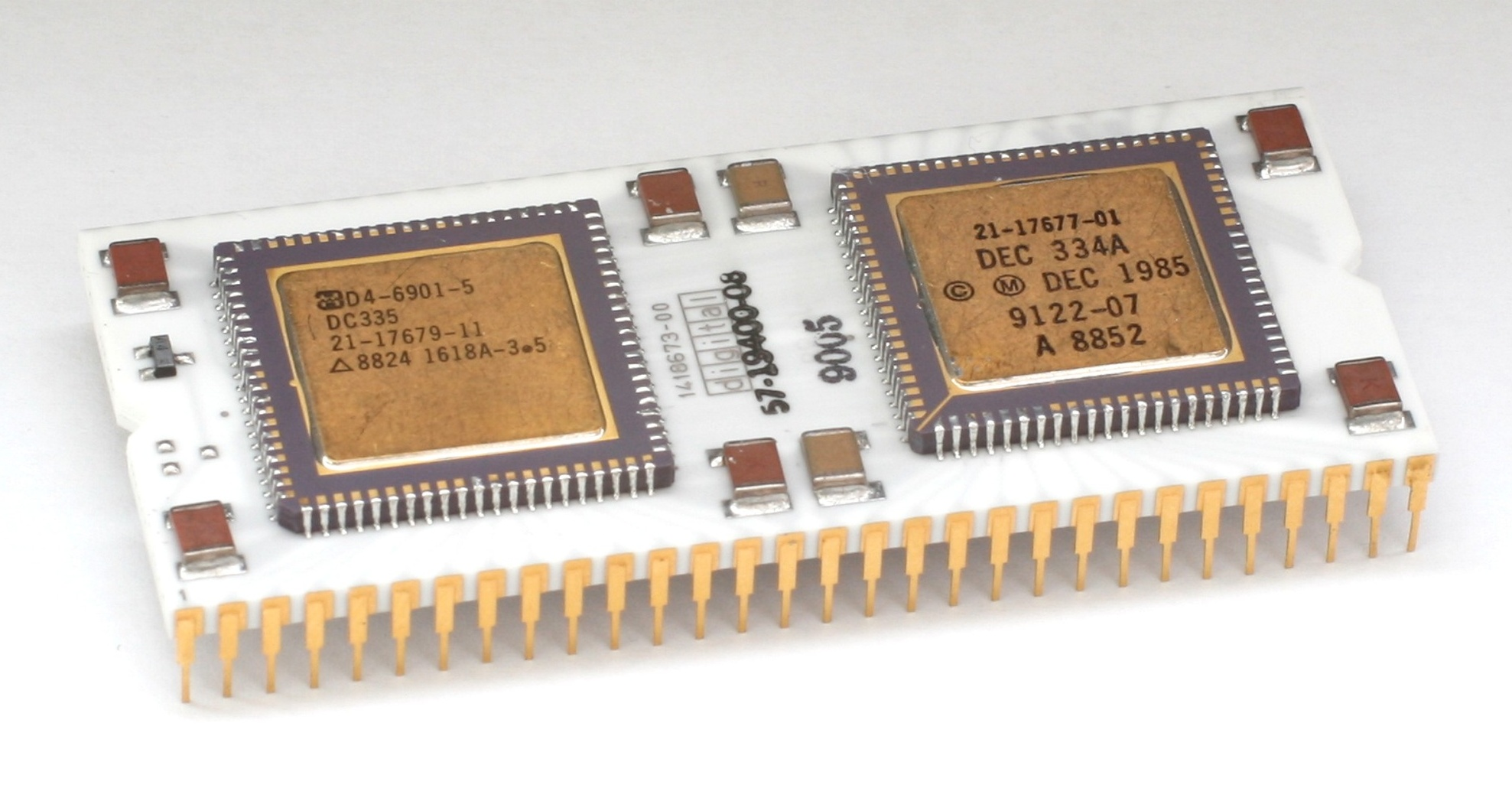
DEC "Jaws-11" (J11) Chipset

Later, the Professional 380 (PRO-380) was introduced using the much faster J-11 chip set (as used in 11/73 systems). However, due to clocking issues on the motherboard, the J-11 chip runs at 10 MHz instead of 16-18 MHz, thus making the PRO-380 slower than a stock 11/73 system.

The DEC Professional Series PC-38N is a PRO-380 with a real-time interface (RTI) that is used as the console for the VAX 8500 and 8550. The RTI has two serial line units: one connects to the VAX environmental monitoring module (EMM) and the other is a spare that can be used for data transfer. The RTI also has a programmable peripheral interface (PPI) consisting of three 8-bit ports for transferring data, address, and control signals between the console and the VAX console interface.

== Graphics ==
The Pro had highly advanced graphic capabilities for its time. The graphic card for the Pro 325/350 has 32 KB of RAM and can display two-color screens at either 1024x240@60 Hz or 1024x256@50 Hz. It can also display 512 pixels per line when each pixel has 4 levels of intensity. The other option is 256 pixels per line when each pixel has 16 levels of intensity. The standard software only uses the 1024x240 mode. Moreover the standard software uses only 960 pixels out 1024.

To display colors, an additional card should be installed, which adds 64 KB of RAM. This card enables to display 8 colors per pixel using a 256-color palette. This is mapped mode. The standard software uses only this mode. However it is possible to use the unmapped graphic mode when each graphic plane provides intensity for its base color. This allows 4096 colors to be displayed simultaneously when 256 pixels are displayed per line, or 64 colors when 512 pixels are displayed per line.

The Pro 380 graphics is more advanced. The standard graphic card is integrated into the motherboard. The card has 128 KB of memory. This enables the use of interlaced modes, which double the vertical resolution. The optional color supplement card adds 256 KB of RAM. The Pro 380 color graphics enables the use of 4096 palette colors in mapped mode. The Pro 380 can hold 4 uninterlaced pictures or 2 interlaced in its video RAM.

== Clones ==
Like the PDP-8 and PDP-11 before it, the Professional 350 was cloned by Elektronika in the Soviet Union.

Other PDP-11 clones:

- Elektronika 60
- Elektronika 85 (a.k.a. Elektronika MS-0585)
