= IntervalZero =

IntervalZero, Inc.
- Type: Private
- Industry: Computer software
- Founded: 2008
- Headquarters: Waltham, Massachusetts, USA
- Key people: Jeffrey D. Hibbard, CEO
- Website: www.intervalzero.com
- Footnotes; Formerly: Ardence, Inc., VenturCom

IntervalZero, Inc. develops hard real-time software and its symmetric multiprocessing (SMP) enabled RTX and RTX64 software transform the Microsoft Windows general-purpose operating system (GPOS) into a real-time operating system (RTOS).

IntervalZero and its engineering group regularly release new software (cf its history).

Its most recent product, RTX64, focuses on 64-bit and symmetric multiprocessing (SMP) to replace dedicated hardware based systems such as digital signal processors (DSPs) or field-programmable gate arrays (FPGAs) with multicore PCs.

For instance, an audio mixing surface manufacturer which largely deployed DSP based systems, switched to personal computer (PC) based systems, dedicating multi-core processors for the real time audio processing.

Founded in July 2008 by a group of former Ardence executives, IntervalZero is headed by CEO Jeffrey D. Hibbard. The firm has offices in Waltham, MA; Nice, France; Munich, Germany, and Taiwan, ROC.

IntervalZero's solutions are deployed worldwide, primarily in industrial automation, military, aerospace, medical devices, digital media, and test and simulation software.

The corporate name, IntervalZero, comes from the technical definition of the optimal experience between a system command and execution.

== History ==
In 1980, a group of Massachusetts Institute of Technology engineers started VenturCom and began to develop expertise in embedded technology. It was during this time that Venix was developed and marketed.

In 1995, VenturCom released RTX, extensions for Windows NT 4.0 intended for development of real-time applications using regular Windows development tooling. Since then, a lot of controllers are PC and Windows based.

In 1996, VenturCom released Component Integrator, a tool for deploying Windows NT-based embedded systems It was licensed by Microsoft in 1998 and became the origin of Windows NT Embedded.

In 2004, VenturCom, was renamed Ardence.

In December 2006, Citrix Systems announced an agreement to acquire Ardence's enterprise and embedded software businesses. It integrated the software streaming products into the Citrix portfolio in 2007 and early 2008.

In 2008, a group of former Ardence executives founded IntervalZero and acquired the Ardence embedded software business from Citrix Systems Inc. Citrix retained a minority ownership the firm.

On July 28, 2008, IntervalZero announced that it had acquired the Ardence embedded software division with Citrix Systems Inc.

== Products ==
IntervalZero develops RTX and RTX64, hard real-time software that transforms Microsoft Windows into a real-time operating system (RTOS).

== Executive officers ==
- Jeffrey D. Hibbard, chief executive officer
- Mark Van Vranken, chief financial officer
- Brian Calder, vice president, North America sales & marketing
- Daron Underwood, vice president, CTO
- Brian Carter, vice president, strategic communications
- Bryan Levey, vice president, engineering
