= Rainbow 100 =

1982 DEC microcomputer

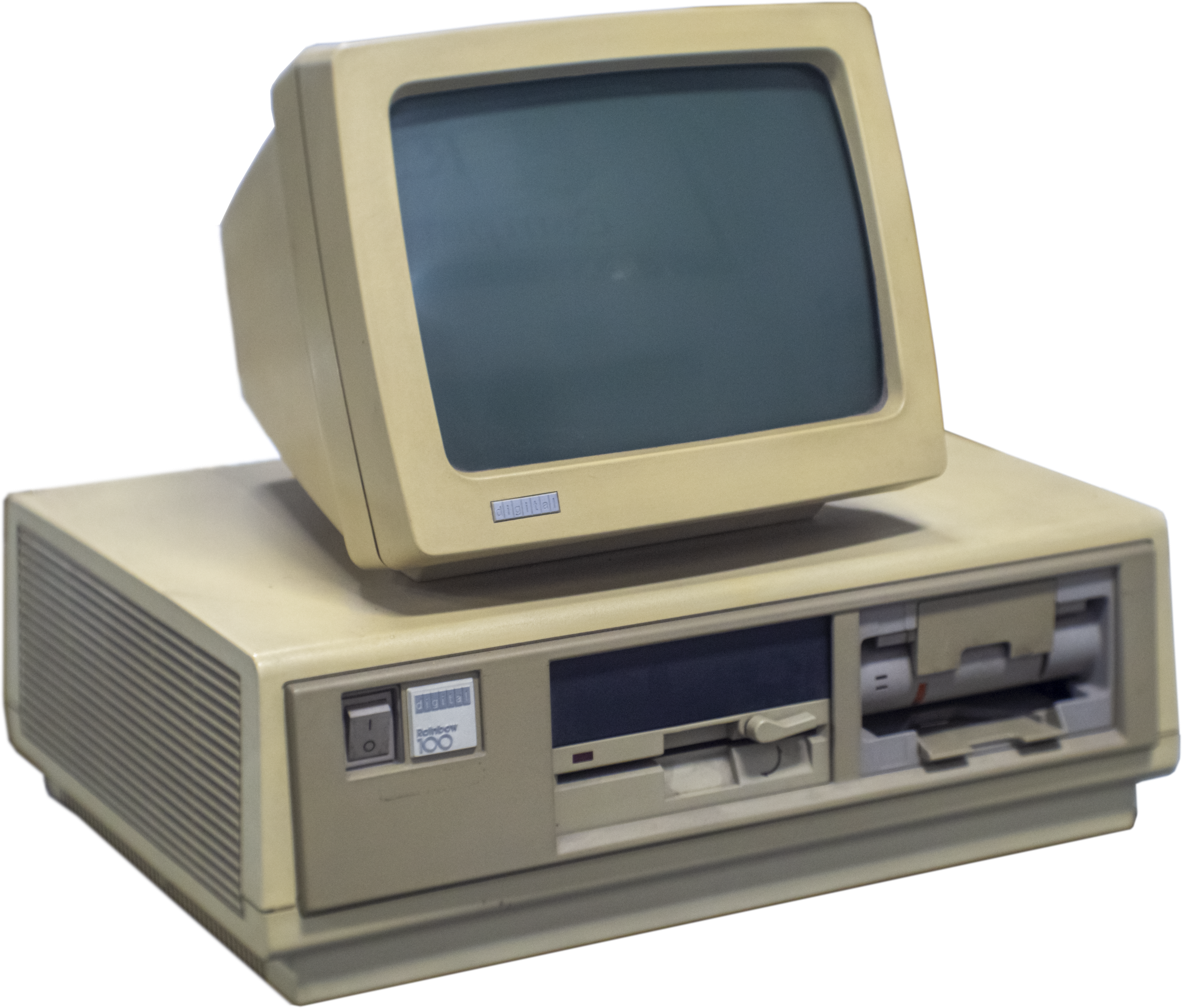
- DEC Rainbow 100
- Manufacturer: Digital Equipment Corporation (DEC)
- Type: Personal computer
- Released: 1982; 44 years ago
- Operating system: CP/M, MS-DOS, UCSD p-System, Concurrent CP/M, Venix, QNX, Windows 1.0
- CPU: Zilog Z80 @ 4.012 MHz; Intel 8088 @ 4.815 MHz
- Memory: 64 - 896 KB
- Successor: VAXmate

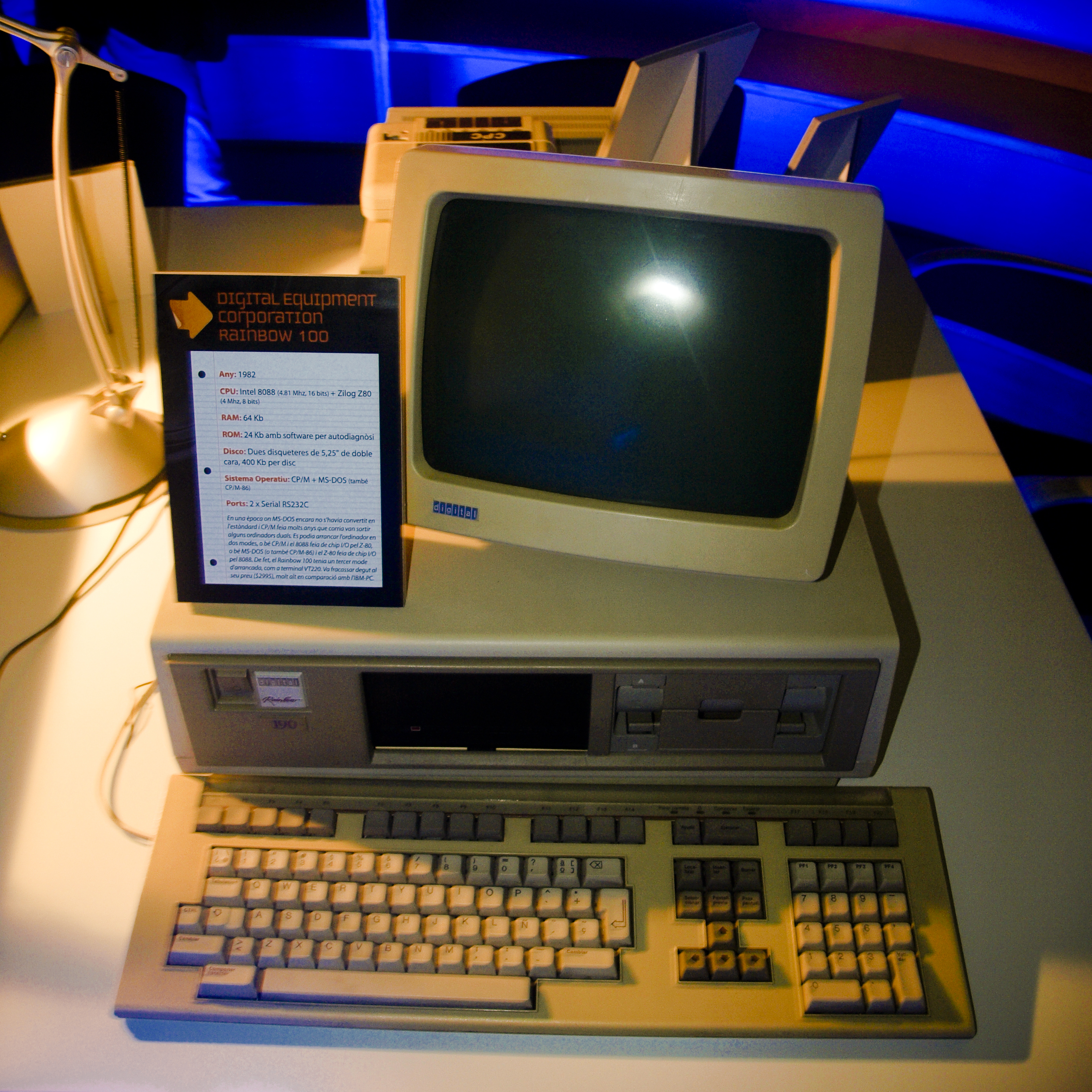
DEC Rainbow 100 as a museum piece in Citilab

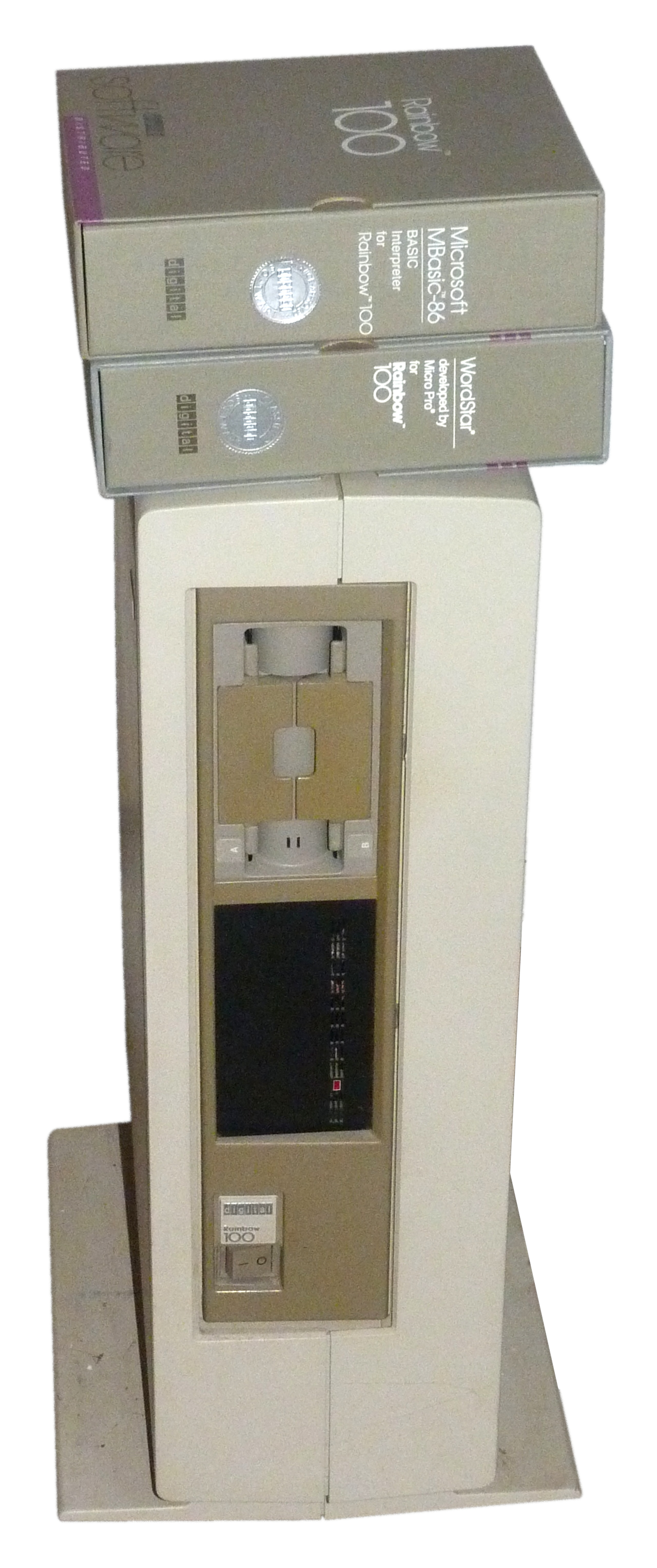
Rainbow 100 floor model and software packages

The Rainbow 100 is a microcomputer introduced by Digital Equipment Corporation (DEC) in 1982. This desktop unit had a monitor similar to the VT220 and a dual-CPU box with both 4 MHz Zilog Z80 and 4.81 MHz Intel 8088 CPUs. The Rainbow 100 was a triple-use machine: VT100 mode (industry standard terminal for interacting with DEC's own VAX), 8-bit CP/M mode (using the Z80), and CP/M-86 or MS-DOS mode using the 8088. It ultimately failed to succeed in the marketplace which became dominated by the simpler IBM PC and its clones which established the industry standard as compatibility with CP/M became less important than IBM PC compatibility. Writer David Ahl called it a disastrous foray into the personal computer market. The Rainbow was launched along with the similarly packaged DEC Professional and DECmate II which were also not successful. The failure of DEC to gain a significant foothold in the high-volume PC market would be the beginning of the end of the computer hardware industry in New England, as nearly all computer companies located there were focused on minicomputers for large organizations, from DEC to Data General, Wang, Prime, Computervision, Honeywell, and Symbolics.

== Models ==
The Rainbow came in three models, the 100A, 100B and 100+. The "A" model was the first released, followed later by the "B" model. The most noticeable differences between the two models were the firmware and slight hardware changes. The systems were referred to with model numbers PC-100A and PC-100B respectively; later "B" models were also designated PC-100B2. The system included a user-changeable ROM chip in a special casing to support their keyboard layout and language of the boot screen. On the 100A, the ROMs only supported three languages. The Rainbow did not have an ISA bus, so the typical 640 KB RAM limit didn't apply, with both models supporting a maximum RAM of over 800 KB.

=== PC-100A ===
The "A" model was the first produced by Digital. The distinguishing characteristic of the "A" model from an end-user perspective was that the earlier firmware did not support booting from a hard disk. Other distinguishing hardware features included the three 2764 (8 KB) ROM chips holding the system firmware and the case fan/power supply combinations. In addition, the 100A was unable to move its hardware interrupt vectors to avoid the conflict with MS-DOS soft 21 INT, etc. DOS had to take unusual actions to distinguish between the hard and soft vectors. The Rainbow 100A initially only supported 256 KB of RAM total, but the limitation in the memory expansion slot was later worked around with a special adapter card, though the maximum was limited to 828 KB.

=== PC-100B and PC100+ ===
The "B" model followed the "A" model, and introduced a number of changes. The "B" model featured the ability to boot from a hard disk (referred to as the Winchester drive) via the boot menu due to updated firmware. The hardware changes included larger firmware stored on two 27128 (16 KB) ROMs and an improved case fan/power supply. The firmware allowed selection of the boot screen language and keyboard layout, eliminating the need to switch ROM. The "B" model also allowed remapping of hardware interrupts to be more compatible with MS-DOS. The B model also improved the memory expansion slot to allow a maximum configuration of 892 KB.

The "100+" model was actually a marketing designation signifying that the system shipped with a hard drive installed; the "100+" and "B" models were identical in all other respects. When a hard-disk option was installed on the Rainbow, the kit included the 100+ emblem for the computer's case.

== Hardware ==
=== CPUs ===
The Rainbow contained two separate data buses controlled by the Zilog Z80 and the Intel 8088 respectively. The buses exchanged information via a shared 62 KB memory.

When not executing 8-bit code, the Zilog Z80 was used for floppy disk access. The 8088 bus was used for control of all other subsystems, including graphics, hard disk access, and communications. While it may have been theoretically possible to load Z80 binary code into the Rainbow to execute alongside 8088 code, this procedure has never been demonstrated.

The 8088 could be upgraded to the faster NEC V20 chip. This gave about 10-15% speed improvement, but required changes to the system's ROMs to fix two timing loops.

=== Memory ===
The 100A model shipped with 64 KB memory on the motherboard, while the 100B had 128 KB memory on the motherboard. Daughterboards were available from Digital Equipment Corporation that could increase system memory with up to an additional 768 KB for a total 892 KB for the 100B or 828 KB for the 100A. The difference in max memory was due to the difference in initial memory configuration.

=== Storage ===
==== Floppy disk drives ====
The floppy disk drives, known as the RX50, accepted proprietary 400 KB single-sided, quad-density 5¼-inch diskettes. Initial versions of the operating systems on the Rainbow did not allow for low-level formatting, requiring users to purchase RX50 media from Digital Equipment Corporation. The high cost of media ($5 per disk) led to accusations of vendor "lock-in" against Digital. However, later versions of MS-DOS and CP/M allowed formatting of diskettes. Formatting software for "normal" diskettes was also made available by third parties.

Of note was the single motor used to drive both disk drives via a common spindle, which were arranged one on top of the other. That meant that one disk went underneath the first but inserted upside-down. This earned the diskette drive the nickname "toaster". The unusual orientation confused many first-time users, who would complain that the machine would not read the disk. This was remedied later by placing a red arrow on the diskette slots and on the top of the diskettes to indicate which side of the diskette to be inserted into each diskette drive.

==== Hard disks ====
Digital Equipment Corporation produced a Winchester disk controller capable of controlling hard disks compatible with the ST-506 interface. The controller, based on the Western Digital WD1010 chip, was limited to a single drive with up to 8 heads and 1024 cylinders, limiting storage to a maximum of 67 MB.

Third-party hard-disk controllers were also available, including a dual Winchester support from CHS

=== Graphics ===
The base system was monochrome only, at odds with rainbow being the product's name, capable of displaying text in 80×24- or 132×24-character format. The system could apply attributes to text including bolding, double-width, and double-height-double-width.

The graphics option was a user-installable module that added graphics and color display capabilities to the Rainbow system. The Graphic module was based on a NEC 7220 graphic display controller (GDC) and an 8×64 KB DRAM video memory.

Due to the design of the graphics system, the Rainbow was capable of controlling two monitors simultaneously, one displaying graphics and another displaying text.

=== Display ===
The base Rainbow system generates a TTL 15 kHz composite-video signal compatible with RS-170 (NTSC) in monochrome mode. With the inclusion of the graphics option, the Rainbow could also output sync-on-green RGB video signals at TTL levels. The Rainbow was most often coupled with the 12-inch VR201 monochrome monitor or the 13-inch VR241 color monitor, both produced by Digital Equipment Corporation. The Rainbow was unique, in that the power for the monochrome monitor was supplied through the single video cable, eliminating the need for a separate power cable.

=== Keyboard ===
The Rainbow 100 and the other two microcomputers which DEC announced at the same time (DECmate II and Pro-350) had an LK201 keyboard which was an evolution of the Teletype Model 33 and VT100 keyboard. The VT220 style of this keyboard can clearly be seen in the layout of the enhanced 101-key keyboard adopted by IBM in 1985 which became the dominant full sized keyboard layout style.

=== Third-party ===
Third-party upgrades were also available, including an 80286 (286) processor upgrade (Turbow-286), a 3.5-inch disk adapter kit (IDrive), and a battery-backed clock chip (ClikClok), all from Suitable Solutions.

In 1984, the first computer support for Native American languages began with the Rainbow 100. Rock Point Community School on the Navajo reservation in Arizona commissioned a ROM chip for the Navajo language, enabling the school to create bilingual computer programs.

Univation produced a number of products for the Rainbow as well. They offered add-in memory cards, hard disk controllers and LAN cards. The Univation disk interface was SASI/SCSI-1, but not software compatible with DEC's Winchester Disk option. It was based on a design by Xebec.

C.H.S. created a dual-Winchester controller for the DEC Rainbow as well. It was compatible enough with the DEC's disk controller that one could boot off it on the 100B/100+/190. Like DEC's offering, it was based on Western Digital's WD1010 chip. However, additional drivers were needed to access the second hard drive.

REC of Switzerland created a SCSI card for the Rainbow.

There was an "ACT Winchester Option" available in Australia for which drivers have recently surfaced.

Duncan MacDonald, Inc. offered a 20MB Floppy tape cartridge using a rebranded Cipher Data Products Model 525 floppy-tape cartridge tape drive. It used 3M DC600A tapes and could back up a 20MB RD31 in about 30 minutes. It included software to backup MS-DOS, CP/M and CCP/M partitions. List price in 1987 was $1200. In addition, Duncan MacDonald, Inc. provided MFM disks in 20MB, 40MB, and 67MB that used the same disks that DEC sold for much more, and provided a steel cabinet with power supply so the Rainbow's power supply would not be overtaxed by the power requirements of larger disks.

=== DEC Option Table ===
Here are the various hardware options that were available for the Rainbow (country kits are not yet listed):

Option Number	Board Number	Description
standard	54-15482	RX-50 Diskette Controller
PC-100A	54-15486	CPU Assembly PC100A
PC-1XX-AA	54-15490-AA	64KB Memory Expansion - PC-100A only
PC-1XX-AB	54-15490-AB	192KB Memory Expansion - PC-100A only
PC-1XX-BA	54-15688	Color Graphics Option
PC-1XX-BB	54-15703	Ext Comms Option
PC-1XX-DA	54-16019	RD51 Controller Module
PC-100B, PC-100+, PC-190	54-16206	PC100B System Board
PC-1XX-EA	54-16535	8087 Co-Processor Board
PC-1XX-AC	54-15961-AC	64k byte memory module (socketed) PC-100B or PC-100A with adapter
PC-1XX-AD	54-15961-AD	256k byte memory module (socketed) PC-100B or PC-100A with adapter
PC-1XX-AK		Adapter to allow PC-1XX-AC and PC-1XX-AD to be used in 100A
PC-1XX-AZ		9 x 256kb static RAM chips
PC-1XX-FA		Technical Character Set ROM 100A
PC-1XX-FB		Technical Character Set ROM 100B
RCD31-BA		20MB half height disk and controller 100A
RCD31-BB		20MB half height disk and controller 100B
RD31-BA		Replacement drive for RD-51
PC-XXF-BA		Floor stand unit

Data compiled from a number of sources including

== Software ==
The Rainbow runs the CP/M-86/80 operating system, which detects whether software is written for 16-bit CP/M-86 or 8-bit CP/M-80 and runs it on the appropriate processor. DEC later released a compatible version of MS-DOS, but little DOS software was released on Rainbow media. While it provided the same MS-DOS functions as IBM's PC DOS, it lacked the IBM PC's video and keyboard ROM BIOS interface which most MS-DOS software relied upon, limiting the commercial software that could be run. Towards the end of the Rainbow's life, users were able to run some IBM PC-compatible MS-DOS software using an emulation application called Code Blue, though it emulated only the IBM PC's BIOS and some of the hardware, so programs that accessed the video cards directly would not work very well.

MS-DOS compatibility was added late in the design, so hardware interrupts and MS-DOS software interrupts overlapped. One DEC documentation pack for developers included a listing of Microsoft assembly code to handle this. The theory was that hardware interrupts would interrupt again but software interrupts would only happen once. The Rainbow 100B fixed this overlap in hardware by changes to the board design that allowed the OS to move the hardware interrupts. This means that the MS-DOS 3.10b version for the Rainbow can only run on the Rainbow 100B.

DEC itself ported Microsoft Windows 1.0 to the Rainbow. The Suitable Solutions Turbow-286 board could run a modified version of Windows 3.0.

Software bundled with DEC Rainbow floor model included:

- Microsoft MBasic-86 BASIC interpreter for Rainbow 100
- WordStar developed by Micro Pro for Rainbow 100

There are 12 commercial games released for Rainbow 100, all text adventures from Infocom

Name	Publisher
Deadline	Infocom
Enchanter	Infocom
The Hitchhiker's Guide to the Galaxy	Infocom
Infidel	Infocom
Planetfall	Infocom
Sorcerer	Infocom
Starcross	Infocom
Suspended	Infocom
The Witness	Infocom
Zork I	Infocom
Zork II	Infocom
Zork III	Infocom

== Documentation ==
- Rainbow 100 Technical Manual
- Getting Started with Rainbow 100
- MBasic-86 User's Guide Digital Equipment Corporation Distributed
- WordStar User's Guide for Rainbow 100
- License and Software Product Description

These documents come in booklets contained inside two hard case boxes, with the DEC logo.

== Problems ==
The Rainbow used a distinct version of MS-DOS, so it was not completely software- or hardware-compatible with the IBM PC or PC DOS. The expectation was for programs to target the MS-DOS interface and not the underlying hardware. However, many significant commercial software products were writing directly to the hardware for a variety of reasons, including performance. After the Compaq Portable and other clones, the market expectation was that all MS-DOS versions would be fully IBM PC compatible. Later, Microsoft would stop licensing distinctive OEM versions and sell standardized MS-DOS 5.0 at retail. While "Code Blue" did a good job at emulating the IBM BIOS, its inability to trap references to the video and other hardware limited what would run on the Rainbow. The FOSSIL TSR allowed several terminal programs and editors to run on the IBM-PC, Rainbow, and other early 8088/8086 computers, but its limited adoption hampered its usefulness. Various other hacks allowed popular programs such as Turbo Pascal and Turbo C to run. Such patches circulated, but new releases made these difficult to keep up with, and over time these hacks dried up (the online archives have very little new after 1991 or 1992, although some of that may be due to the RABIT TSR, which solved the problem generically for all Borland products).

The DEC Rainbow 100 MS-DOS did support FAT formatted floppies. They were FAT12 format on 80-track, single-sided, quad-density 5.25" drives. The first two tracks were reserved for the boot loader, but didn't contain an MBR nor a BPB (MS-DOS 2.x and 3.10 on the Rainbow used a static in-memory BPB instead). The boot sector (track 0, side 0, sector 1) was Z80 code beginning with DI 0xF3. The 8088 bootstrap was loaded by the Z80. Track 1, side 0, sector 2 starts with the Media/FAT ID byte 0xFA. Unformatted disks use 0xE5 instead. The file system starts on track 2, side 0, sector 1. There are 2 copies of the FAT and 96 entries in the root directory. In addition, there is a physical to logical track mapping to effect a 2:1 sector interleaving. The disks were formatted with the physical sectors in order numbered 1 to 10 on each track after the reserved tracks, but the logical sectors from 1 to 10 were stored in physical sectors 1, 6, 2, 7, 3, 8, 4, 9, 5, 10. This makes it hard to create Rainbow disk images since all existing tools assume there will be an MBR with a BPB, and required various hacks to make up for the lack of on-disk BPB.

The DEC Rainbow 100 had no general expansion bus. Instead, it had a number of expansion slots that could be used for a single purpose only: extra memory, graphics, RX-50 floppy controller. One slot was originally designed for a DMA enabled serial card, but hard disk controllers were used there instead because DEC bet wrong on which was more important. Univation produced an Ethernet card that could boot the Rainbow over the network for that slot. It stacked to allow both hard disk and Ethernet in the same box, but it cost $750 which was prohibitively expensive so few Rainbows had Ethernet. While the software incompatibilities were bad, the lack of expansion hardware flexibility was worse, and the inability to use ISA cards, despite their flaws at the time, played a significant role in the Rainbow fading from the scene.

== Legacy ==
The Multi Emulator Super System can run the Rainbow-specific Windows 1.0.

The Rainbow 100 played a small but important role in the creation of the FidoNet system. A computer club in St. Louis was in the process of setting up a BBS system using CBBS on CP/M when they learned that DEC would be giving the club a Rainbow 100 for free. The group planned on starting the BBS on this machine as soon as it arrived; but, when it did, they found that the Z80 did not have access to the serial ports. Casting about for a new BBS platform that ran on DOS, they learned of FidoBBS and arranged to have its developer port the serial drivers to the Rainbow platform. This ran up considerable phone bills sending emails and file transfers between St. Louis and the developer in San Francisco, and the developer produced FidoNet as a method of automating exchanges late at night when phone rates were lower.

The DEC Rainbow was also the first Personal Computer to use the now ubiquitous 'inverted T' cursor key layout on its DEC LK201 keyboard, Other machines of its time and for a number years after used their own unique layouts for cursor keys. The 'inverted T' cursor layout is something that would not become common until the IBM Model M keyboard standardized the 'inverted T' cursor layout three years later.

Piers Anthony wrote many of his books from the '80s on his DEC Rainbow.

The DEC Rainbow can be seen in the films Ghostbusters, Beverly Hills Cop, and Firestarter.

Michael Paré watches a TV commercial for "The Rainbow" in The Philadelphia Experiment.
