= CompuAdd =

American personal computer company, 1982–1994

CompuAdd Corporation
- Type: Private
- Industry: Personal computers and peripherals
- Founded: 1982; 44 years ago in Austin, Texas
- Founder: Bill Hayden
- Defunct: 1994
- Fate: Acquired by Dimeling, Schrieber & Park

CompuAdd Corporation was a manufacturer of personal computers in Austin, Texas. It assembled its product from components manufactured by others. CompuAdd created generic PC clone computers, but unlike most clone makers, it had a large engineering staff. CompuAdd also created a Multimedia PC (MPC), the FunStation, and a Sun workstation clone, the SS-1.

CompuAdd was the largest clone PC manufacturer in Austin until 1993 and outsold PC's Limited (now Dell Computer Corporation). CompuAdd sold PCs to corporate, educational and government entities. CompuAdd Computers 386 was on the US Army's Mobile Missile System in Gulf War 1 (1991) and it was rated and tested by the Army for that use.

== History ==
=== Background ===
Bill Hayden was born in San Antonio, Texas. He went to school at the University of Texas at Austin and graduated with a degree in electrical engineering in 1971. He was employed by Texas Instruments as a design engineer in a classified government reconnaissance project. In 1974, he switched to TI's Calculator Division and became a project engineer. It was there that Hayden claims he developed the entrepreneurial spirit that he later applied when he started CompuAdd.

After several years in this position, which required a great deal of overtime, he decided that he needed more time to contemplate his future. He noticed that quality assurance was less demanding work with shorter hours and switched to that. As his 10-year anniversary with TI approached in 1981, Hayden turned in his resignation.

=== Products and retail stores ===
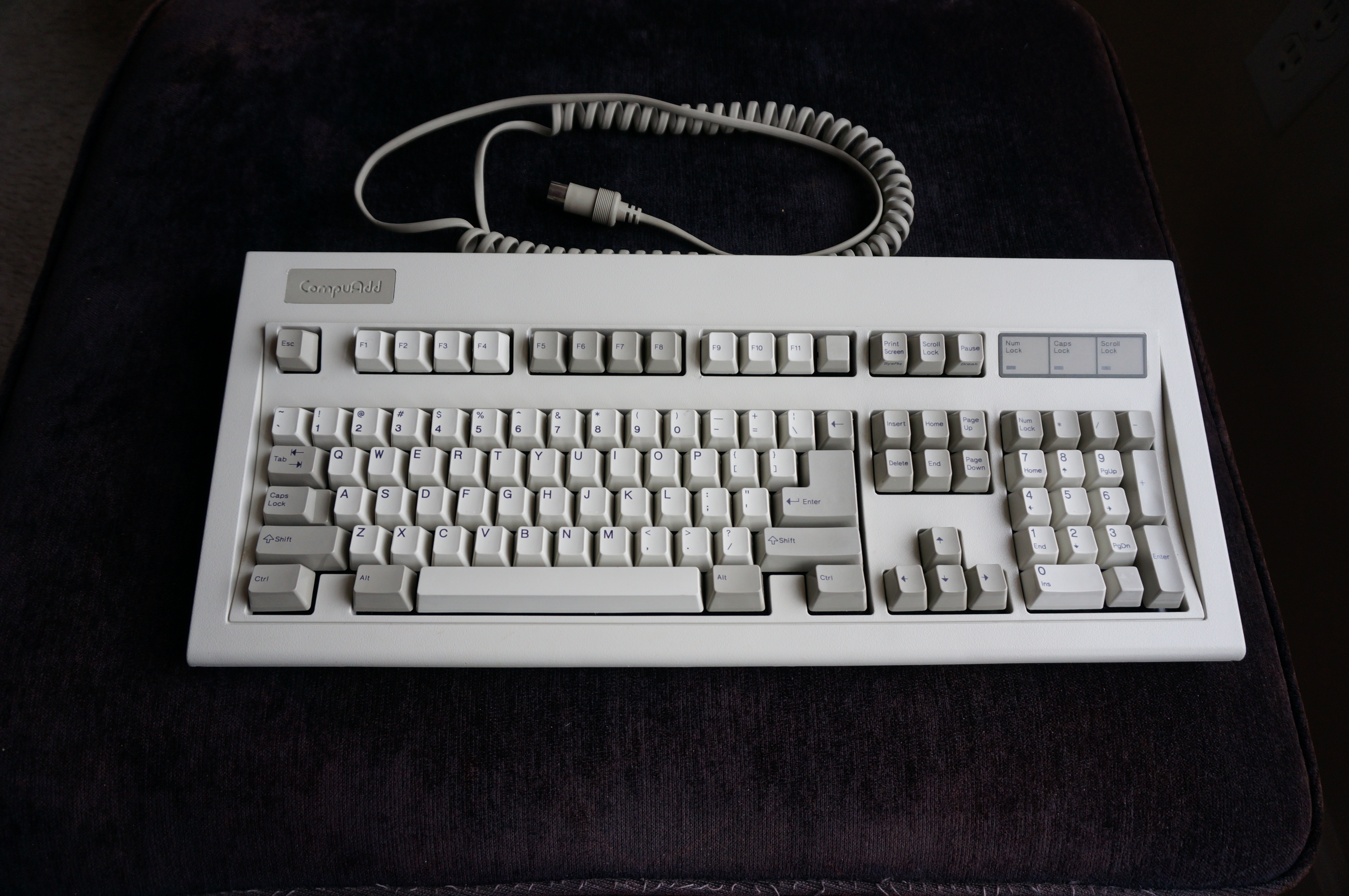
A CompuAdd-branded Model M keyboard

CompuAdd was founded by Bill Hayden in the following year, 1982, by using $100,000 earned by selling real estate part-time. Hayden sold computer peripherals and add-on devices such as disk drives. The name came from this computer add-on business plan.

The company's marketing slogan was: Customer Driven, by Design, and it prided itself on its "no frills" corporate culture.

CompuAdd operated a chain of retail computer stores in the United States. They also had a strong server line. At the height of CompuAdd's reign, it had over 100 salespeople. In 1992, Hayden split the company into two parts: "one to handle 125 retail outlets and international markets" and the other for "large business and government accounts".

Alongside its PC-compatible systems, the company joined several other PC clone manufacturers in introducing workstation products based on the SPARC architecture, colloquially known as SPARC clones and competing with Sun Microsystems' own product range. CompuAdd's SS-1 workstation was described as "basic" and with the "least added value" amongst its clone peers, but competitively priced at $9,695.

In 1992, having initially won a substantial contract to supply the United States Air Force with desktop computers, CompuAdd was forced to suspend a corresponding investment in manufacturing due to challenges made to the outcome of this procurement exercise, these eventually leading to the award of the contract to Zenith Data Systems. Despite this setback, the company secured its largest contract to date, supplying Sears, Roebuck and Co. with point-of-sale systems.

=== Bankruptcy and acquisition ===
In 1993, CompuAdd closed all of its 110 retail stores, to concentrate on direct sales, and sought Chapter 11 bankruptcy protection – but also launched a new line of Centura personal computers. When they emerged from bankruptcy in November 1993, 75 percent ownership of the company was transferred to unsecured creditors, with Hayden retaining 20 percent and the remainder held for employees.

Hayden shortly afterwards resigned as CEO, a position taken over by Richard Krause, the company's president and chief operating officer. Following the consolidation trend within the clone industry, as manufacturers sought to preserve volumes and access to lucrative corporate markets, CompuAdd sought to merge with fellow manufacturer Zeos International. Framed as an acquisition by Zeos, negotiations broke down between the companies, and Zeos was ultimately acquired by Micron Technology. CompuAdd was subsequently bought by Dimeling, Schrieber & Park, a private Philadelphia investment company in September 1994.
