= Zenith SupersPort =

Line of PC-compatible laptops

SupersPort

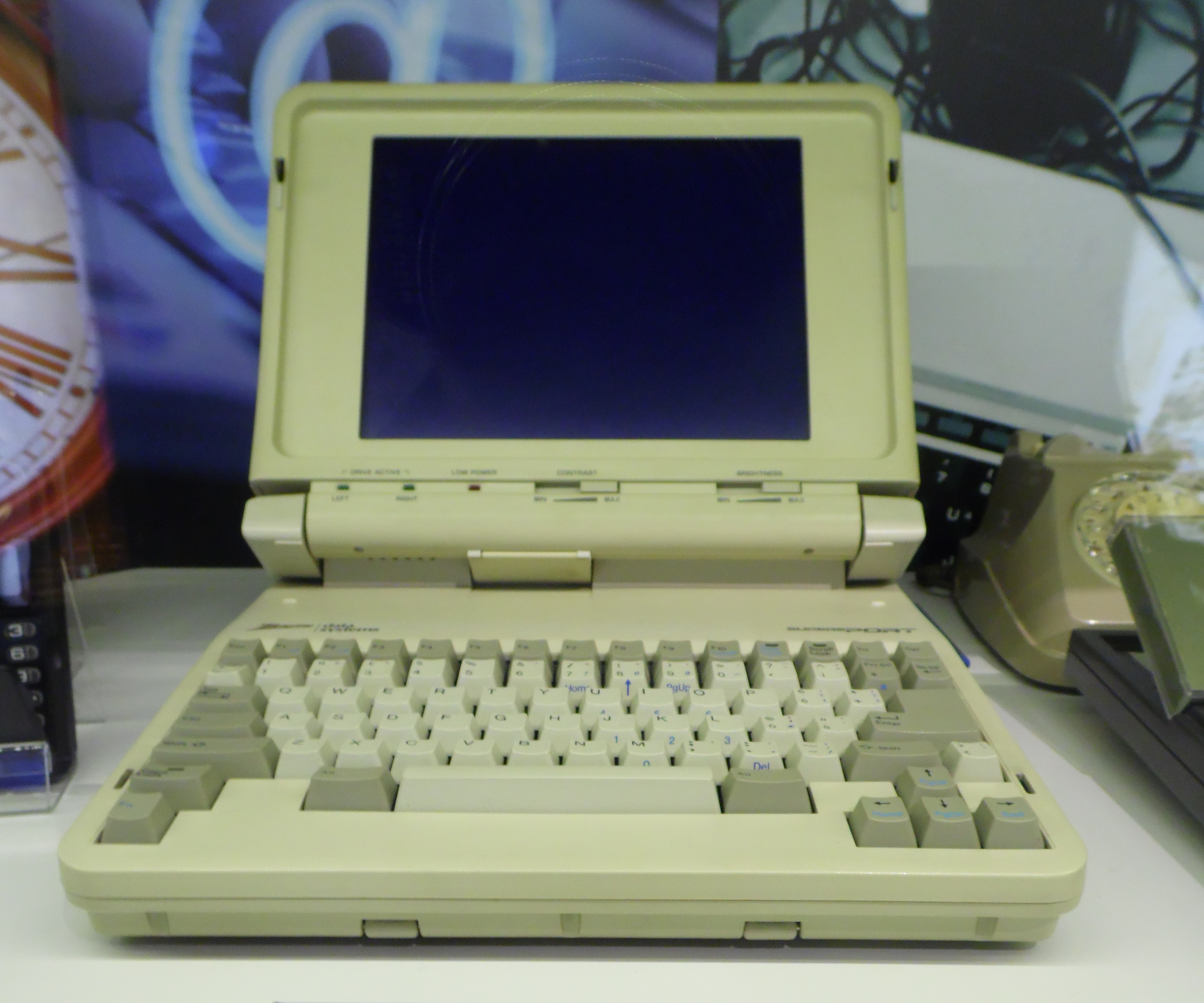
- Zenith SupersPort, 8088 model
- Developer: Zenith Data Systems; Howard Fullmer; Russ Niedzielski
- Manufacturer: Zenith Data Systems
- Type: Laptop
- Released: April 1988
- Operating system: MS-DOS
- CPU: Intel 8088; 80286; 386SX; 486; 486SX
- Display: Electroluminescent super-twisted nematic LCD
- Graphics: Color Graphics Adapter (CGA) (8088 and 286 models); Video Graphics Array (VGA) (later models)
- Predecessor: Z-180
- Successor: MastersPort

The SupersPort is a line of IBM PC compatible laptops manufactured by Zenith Data Systems and sold from 1988 to 1993. The first two main entries in the SupersPort line included either an Intel 80286 microprocessor clocked at 12 MHz or an 8088 processor clocked at 8 or 4.77 MHz, switchable. Later entries included the 386SX, 486SX and 486 processors. The SupersPort 286 in particular was one of the top-selling laptops of the late 1980s, although Zenith's position in this segment faltered by the early 1990s.

== Development and release ==
Zenith Data Systems unveiled the SupersPort line alongside Zenith's TurbosPort 386 luggable computer on April 19, 1988. Both the SupersPort and TurbosPort were marketed under the company's new Road Warrior umbrella of battery-powered portable computers, a project helmed by Andy Czernek and John Frank, VP of marketing and president of Zenith respectively. Meanwhile, Howard Fullmer and Russ Niedzielski were responsible for the SupersPort's design. Both were initially assembled in the company's manufacturing plant in St. Joseph, Michigan, a union shop represented by United Steelworkers; according to Czernek, Zenith was the only union-manufactured personal computer in the world at the time. In keeping with the Road Warrior theme, the unveiling was held at an event center in Chicago, Illinois, with helmeted performers and motorcyclists showcasing the SupersPort and TurbosPort.

The lowest-cost initial entries in the SupersPort line, running an Intel 8088 microprocessor, are the successors to the company's Z-180 line of laptops. Both the 8088 SupersPort and the SupersPort 286 feature an improved design of the EL-backlit STN LCDs introduced with the Z-180 line, doubling the vertical resolution (for a total resolution of 640 by 400 pixels, CGA double-scan) and possessing a brighter backlight element. They both feature more power-efficient electronics and a smaller profile and weight. While the 8088 SupersPort was marketed toward university students, the SupersPort 286—featuring an Intel 80286 clocked at 12 MHz (with no wait states)—was aimed at business professionals. The SupersPort 286 was one of the first battery-powered 286 laptops; Zenith claimed it was the fastest 286 portable at the time of its release.

Both the 8088 SupersPort (actually featuring a 80C88 switchable between 8 and 4.77 MHz and simply called the SupersPort) and the SupersPort 286 came in two variants each. The SupersPort Model 2 was the lowest-cost affair and features dual 720 KB, 3.5-inch floppy disk drives; both are equipped with 640 KB of memory standard. The SupersPort Model 20 swaps one of the two floppy drives for a 20 MB hard drive. The SupersPort 286 Model 20 features a high-density 1.44 MB, 3.5-inch floppy disk drive and same 20 MB hard drive as the aforementioned model, while the SupersPort Model 40 features a 40 MB drive; both come with 1 MB RAM stock. The 80C88 SupersPort Model 20 weighs 13.4 pounds (6.1 kg), while the SupersPort 286 Model 20 weighs a little over 10 pounds (4.5 kg).

The TurbosPort and 8088 SupersPort were released to the public in April 1988. The SupersPort 286 was released a month later, held back by FCC clearance. A kit version of the SupersPort 286 was offered by Zenith's Heath division in the beginning of 1989. The Heath SupersPort 286 sold for US$3,678, against the $4,999 retail price of the fully assembled Zenith SupersPort 286.

== Sales ==
Although Zenith refused to disclose sales figures of their computers, the company reportedly sold roughly 173,910 SupersPorts by the end of 1988, or 25.5 percent of all 682,000 laptops sold that year.

In May 1988, as part of a multi-million dollar agreement, Zenith became the official supplier of laptops for the Master's program of Harvard Business School. As part of this agreement, Harvard recommended incoming post-graduates acquire the SupersPort 286 for use with coursework. Harvard Business School's Master's program in fall 1988 had 800 students registered to enter; Zenith expected to sell roughly 640 units to them. The School had prescribed IBM PCs to students in the prior four years; Zenith beat out IBM and four other competitors for the 1988 contract. Later that May, Zenith signed an agreement with Hewlett-Packard to act as an OEM for HP, rebadging the SupersPort 286 as a laptop under Hewlett-Packard's Vectra line of IBM PC compatibles. While Hewlett-Packard had sold two models of laptops of its own design under the Vectra line, it only achieved limited success, and the company admitted to the press that Zenith's product was more feature-packed and offered higher performance. The SupersPort-based HP laptop was released as the Vectra LS/12 in January 1989, by which point the SupersPort 286 was among the top-selling laptops on the market.

== Reception ==
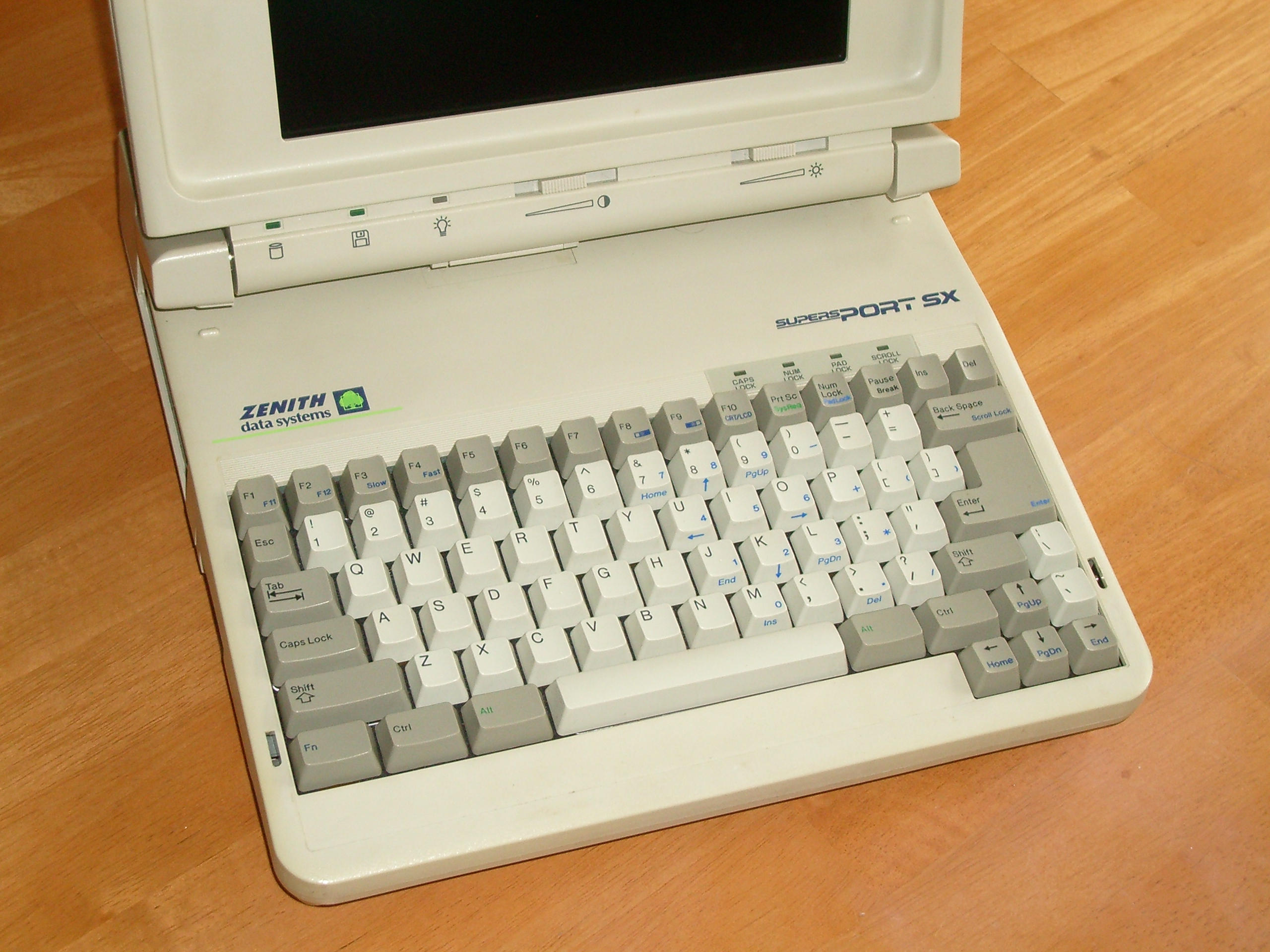
The keyboard of the SupersPort (386SX model pictured – see § Later models)

Sherwin Levinson of InfoWorld wrote that "the Zenith SupersPort 286 may well be the harbinger of a new era of laptop computing", "embod[ying] a combination of speed, weight, size, and battery life that we've seen in no other laptop" and that "Zenith's engineers have come closer to the ideal laptop than any so far". Levinson particularly praised the processing speed, hard disk access times and battery life of the SupersPort 286 and while finding some software incompatibility with FastBack Plus and Crosstalk Mk.4, he wrote that such errors were correctable and subsequent tests ran fine afterwards. Levinson found reservation with the keyboard layout which he deemed slightly cramped and recommended purchasers get the optional numeric keypad.

Jerry Pournelle wrote in Byte that "I love it when I get it to my hotel room", but the SupersPort 286 was "just darned too heavy" to carry to meetings. A full review of the SupersPort 286 in the same issue said that it offered "the computing power of a desktop or transportable machine and the convenient size and weight of a laptop". The magazine approved of the "easy to read" screen (except "the common problem of poor cursor legibility"), keyboard, and performance. While reporting that the battery pack and power supply made the computer very heavy, and that it was too long to fit on an airline coach class tray-table, BYTE said that "it was a pleasure to have such a powerful computer literally at my fingertips while traveling".

Allan S. Papkin of United Press International called the SupersPort 286 "clearly [o]ne of the best laptops going". He continued that, although "not the lightest in its class, nor by any means the least costly", "it deserves serious consideration. Its advantages far outweigh what I regard are very few shortcomings". Bill Howard of PC Magazine, writing a year after the SupersPort 286's release, wrote that the machine was "still competent" as a business laptop and praised the display and keyboard. While calling the industrial design of the laptop "trendsetting", he called the battery enclosure "less than elegant" on account of its heft and dumbbell shape. The magazine said that the Vectra LS/12 was less expensive than its Zenith counterpart, added some useful utilities, and benefited from HP's support network.

Reviewing the 8088 SupersPort in PC Magazine, Nora Georgas wrote that while the laptop was more expensive than Toshiba's Toshiba T1000, she preferred the SupersPort's screen and keyboard and called it a "good low-end laptop" overall. A year after its release, in October 1989, Alfred Poor wrote in PC Magazine that the 8088 SupersPort was beginning to fall behind in usability and speed, calling the hard disk speed unremarkable and the processing speed mediocre. He praised the laptop's backlit display and called the battery life reasonable, but found the design of the battery attachment mechanism flawed, as it prevented users from plugging in peripherals to the rear ports without first removing the rather bulky battery and unlatching the peripheral port door.

== Later models ==
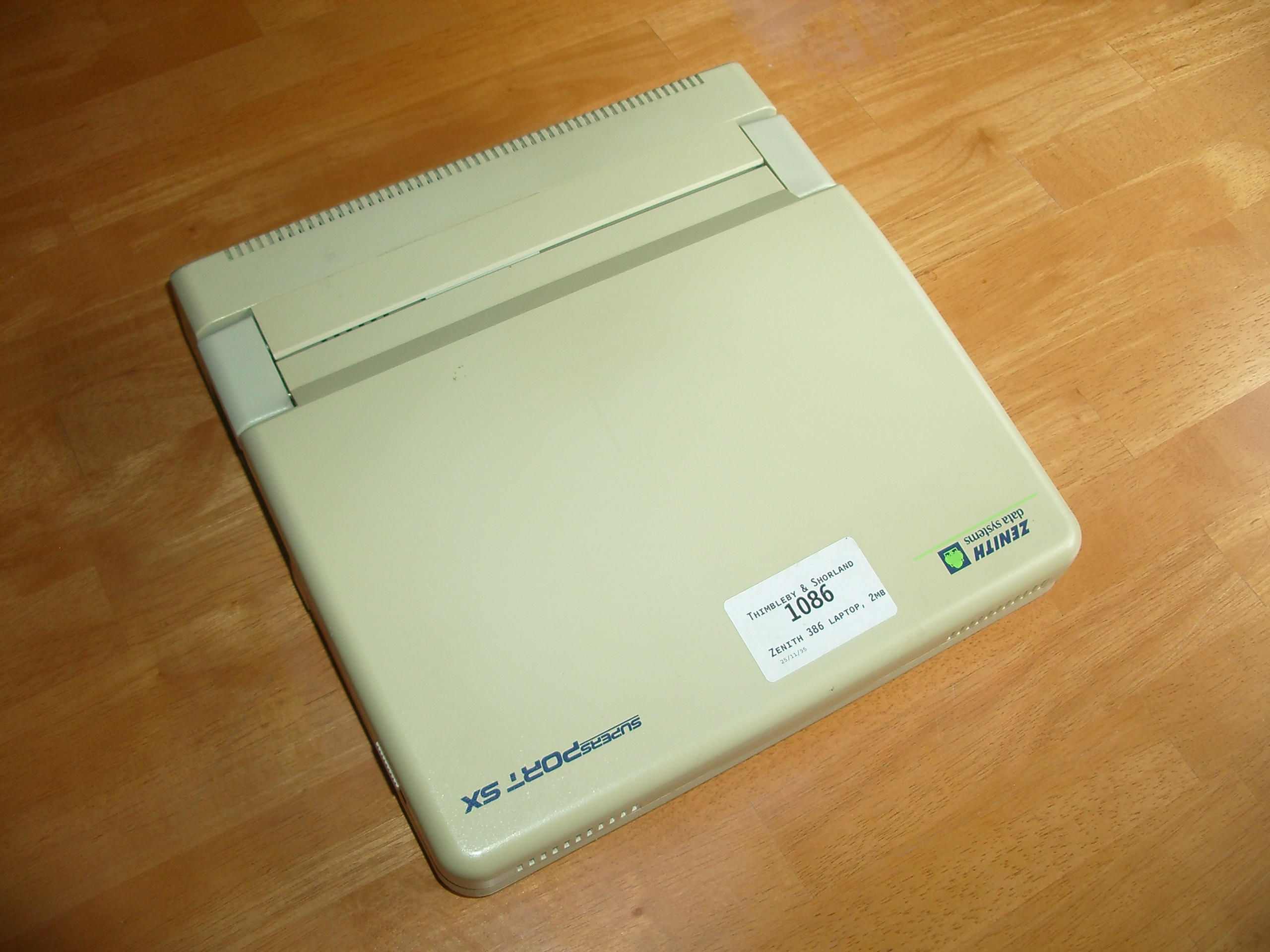
Zenith SupersPort SX, lid closed

- SupersPort 286e (October 1989) – retains the zero wait state, 12 MHz 80286 processor of the SupersPort 286 but changes the display to a backlit supertwist LCD with a resolution of 640×480, on account of its upgraded graphics chip now supporting VGA resolution modes; 20 or 40 MB hard drive options
- SupersPort SX (October 1989) – 16 MHz 80386SX processor; supertwist backlit VGA LCD; 1 MB of RAM stock (upgradable to 8 MB); 40 MB or 100 MB hard drive options. This was the first battery-powered laptop with a 386SX processor.
- SupersPort 486 (fall 1991) – 25 MHz 80486 processor; supertwist backlit VGA LCD; 4 MB of RAM stock (upgradable to 16 MB); 120 MB hard drive standard. The SupersPort 486 was among the first battery-powered 486-based laptops.
- SupersPort 486SX (fall 1991) – 20 MHz 80486SX processor; supertwist backlit VGA LCD; 4 MB of RAM stock (upgradable to 16 MB); 120 MB hard drive standard. Like the SupersPort 486, the SupersPort 486SX was among the first battery-powered 486-based laptops.
