= Venix =

Unix operating system for low-end computers

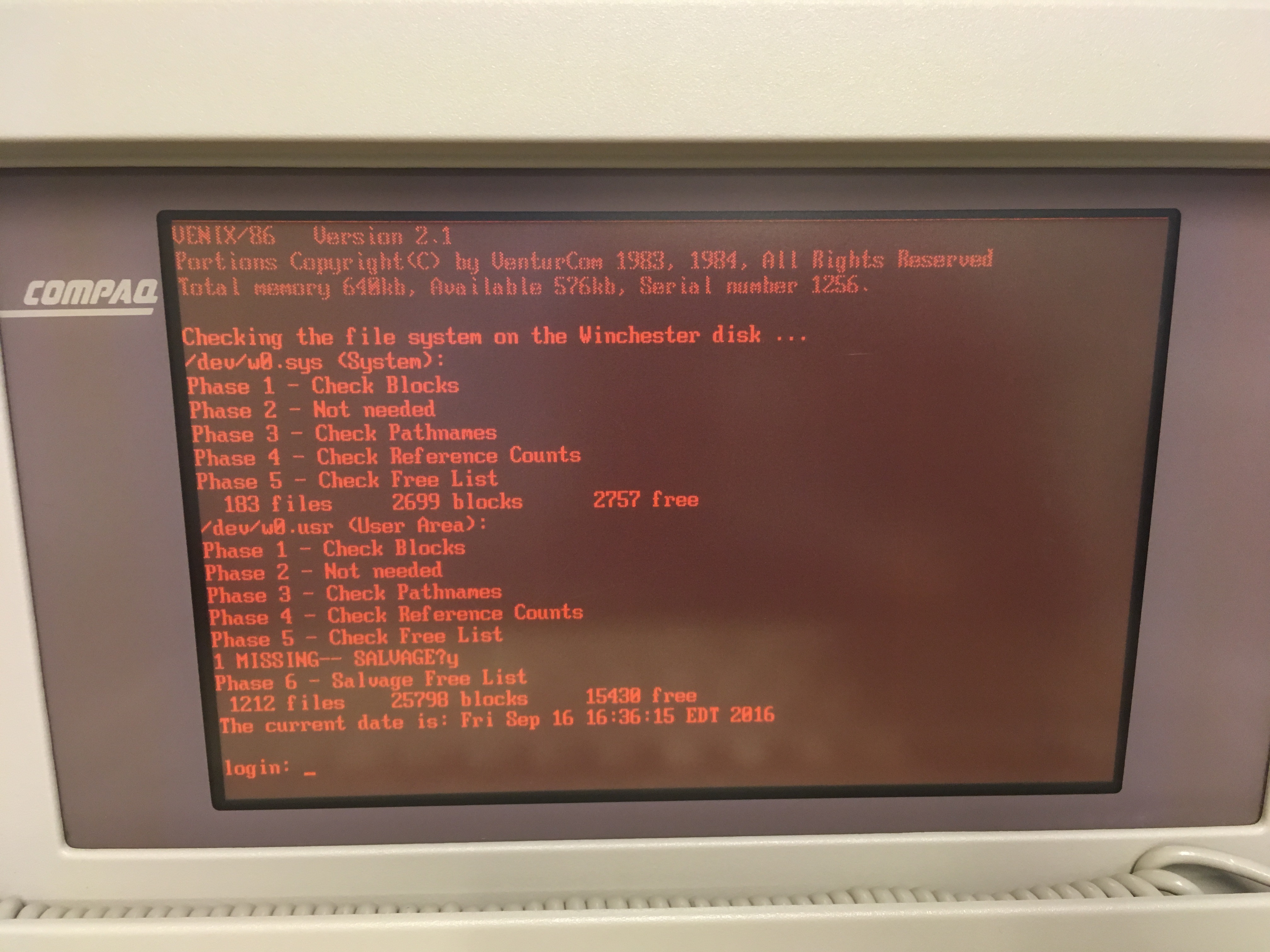
- Venix/86 running on a Compaq Portable III/286 Computer
- Developer: VenturCom
- OS family: Version 7 Unix/System V
- Working state: Historic
- Initial release: 1983; 43 years ago
- Latest release: 4.2.1 / 1994; 32 years ago
- Available in: English
- Supported platforms: DEC PRO-350 and PRO-380 (PDP-11 compatible), DEC PDP-11, DEC Rainbow 100, IBM PC
- Default user interface: Command-line interface (early version), X Window System, Motif, OpenLook

Venix is a discontinued version of the Unix operating system for low-end computers, developed by VenturCom, a "company that specialises in the skinniest implementations of Unix".

== Overview ==
A working version of Venix/86 for the IBM PC XT was demonstrated at COMDEX in May 1983. It was based on Version 7 Unix with some enhancements from BSD (notably vi, more and csh) and custom inter-process communication mechanisms. It was the first licensed UNIX operating system available for the IBM PC and its compatibles, supported read/write access to a separate DOS/FAT-partition and could run in as little as 128 KB (256 KB - 512 KB recommended).

In September 1984, Venix/86 Encore was released; it supported a number of early PC-compatibles, including the AT&T 6300, the Zenith 150, the (first) NCR PC, and the Texas Instruments Professional Computer.

Venix Encore, which then became Venix 2.0, was still based on Version 7 Unix, and ran on the DEC Rainbow 100 (Venix/86R) as well as PCs (Venix/86 and /286). The system contained a number of enhancements, notably tools to access DOS files directly on a DOS/FAT-partition, and an updated ADB debugger. The system came in two flavors: a 2-user version priced at $800, and an 8-user version at $1,000. There were no technical differences between the two.

Confusingly, Venix 2.0 for the DEC PRO-380 microcomputer (Venix/PRO) was based "essentially" on System III. It no longer ran on the PRO-350. This is made clear in the ckermit 4E build instructions, which has a special target for Pro running Venix 1.0, but instructs the user to use the sysiii target for the Pro running Venix 2.0. These same sources also make it clear that Venix had an enhanced TTY interface relative to a pure V7 Unix System.

Venix 2.1 was released for at least the PC. Like the original Venix/86, it included a C compiler, a BASIC interpreter and added a Fortran 77 compiler as an option. An optional driver kit made it possible to develop hardware drivers for the system and generate new kernels. In November 1985, Unisource Software Corp., a Venix retailer, announced the availability of RM/Cobol for Venix.

From version 3.0, Venix was based on System V. A real-time version based on System V.3.2 was released for the 386 in 1990.

The last version, Venix 4.2.1, based on UNIX System V Release 4.2 (UnixWare), was released in 1994. The workstation system included the real-time operating system, NFS and TCP/IP networking, X, OpenLook and Motif GUIs, and the Veritas journaling File System (vxfs). A development system included additionally an ANSI C compiler, a library of real-time functions, GUI development software, real-time development utilities, and selected industrial I/O device drivers.

== Reception ==
In its 1984 review PC Magazine found Venix functional, despite some bugs in the initial versions. Its use of the BIOS for accessing devices made it more portable than its competitor PC/IX, but slowed down its display processing; the disk access speed was found to be similar. BYTE stated that Venix on the DEC Professional and IBM PC "performed adequately," but criticized its limit on background processes.

When the first Dhrystone benchmarks were released, only Coherent UNIX was bench-marked on the 8088, all other PC UNIXs were bench marked on 286 processors.

== See also ==
- Coherent (operating system)
- Idris (operating system)
- Xenix
