= Zenith Data Systems =

American computer company (1979–1996)

Zenith Data Systems Corporation

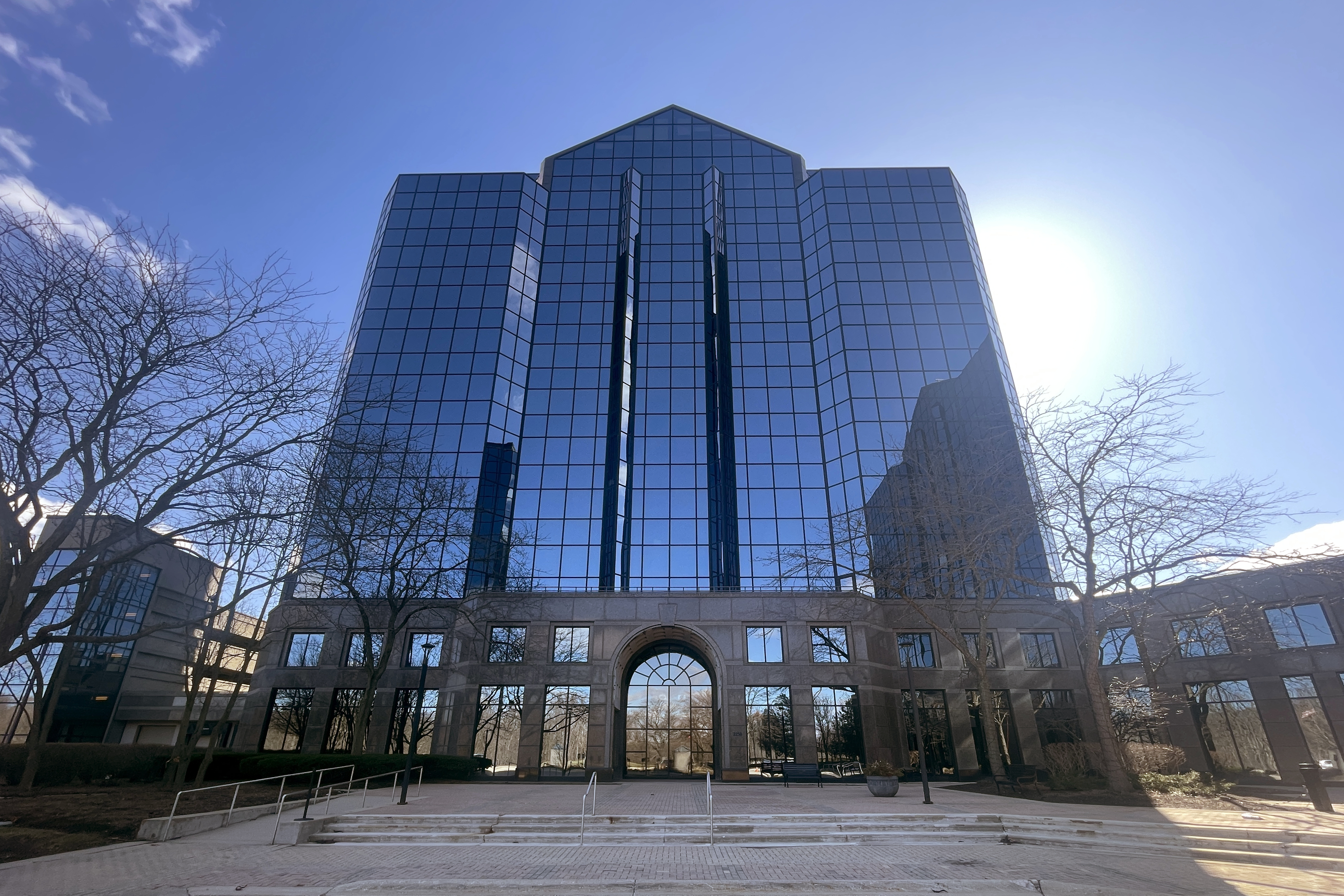
- Top: Logo used from 1990 to 1996; Bottom: Site of former headquarters in Buffalo Grove, Illinois, from 1990 to 1996
- Company type: Subsidiary
- Industry: Computer
- Founded: October 1979; 46 years ago in St. Joseph, Michigan, United States
- Defunct: February 1996; 30 years ago
- Fate: Acquired by Groupe Bull in 1989; later acquired by Packard Bell NEC in 1996; brand discontinued in 1999
- Headquarters: Buffalo Grove, Illinois, United States (1990–1996)
- Products: Computer systems
- Revenue: US$1.4 billion (1988, peak)
- Number of employees: 3,800 (1990, peak)
- Parent: Zenith Electronics (1979–1989); Groupe Bull (1989–1996)

Zenith Data Systems Corporation (ZDS) was an American computer systems manufacturing company active from 1979 to 1996. It was originally a division of the Zenith Radio Company (later Zenith Electronics), after that company purchased the Heath Company and its Heathkit line of electronic kits and kit microcomputers, from Schlumberger in October 1979. ZDS originally operated from Heath's own headquarters in St. Joseph, Michigan. By the time Zenith acquired Heathkit, the Heathkit H8 kit computer already had an installed customer base of scientific engineers and computing enthusiasts. ZDS's first offerings were preassembled versions of existing Heathkit computers, but within a few years, the company began selling its own designs including the Zenith Z-100, a hybrid 8085- and 8088-based computer capable of running both CP/M and MS-DOS.

ZDS largely avoided the retail consumer market, instead focusing on selling directly to businesses, educational institutions, and government agencies. By the late 1980s, the company won several lucrative government contracts worth several hundreds of millions of dollars combined, including a US$242-million contract with the United States Department of Defense, the largest such computer-related government contract up to that date. In 1986 the company made headlines when it beat out IBM for a contract with the Internal Revenue Service to supply a portable computer. By the mid-1980s ZDS's profits offset losses in Zenith's television sales. Its Zenith SupersPort laptop was released in 1988 to high demand, composing a quarter of the entire American laptop market that year. The company reached a peak in terms of revenue in 1988, generating US$1.4 billion that year. The following year saw ZDS floundering in multiple ways, including a cancelled contract with the United States Navy and a failed attempt to increase consumer desktop sales. In late 1989, ZDS was purchased by Groupe Bull of France for between $511 million and $635 million.

Following the acquisition, ZDS moved from Michigan to Buffalo Grove, Illinois. In 1991, Enrico Pesatori took over ZDS and attempted to repair relations with dealers while diversifying the product lineup and modes of sales. ZDS slowly recovered during the early 1990s, winning a lucrative contract with the Pentagon in 1993. Pesatori was replaced that year with Jacques Noels of Nokia, who further diversified the company's lineup. ZDS's revenue steadily grew in the North American and European markets in the beginning of 1994. The company was acquired by Packard Bell in February 1996, in a three-way deal which saw Groupe Bull and Japanese electronics conglomerate NEC increasing their existing stakes in Packard Bell. Later, NEC announced that it would acquire Packard Bell, merging it with NEC's global personal computer operations. ZDS continued as a brand of computer systems under the resulting merger, Packard Bell NEC, from 1996 until 1999, when Packard Bell NEC announced that it would withdraw from the American computer market.

== History ==
=== Foundation (1979–1982) ===
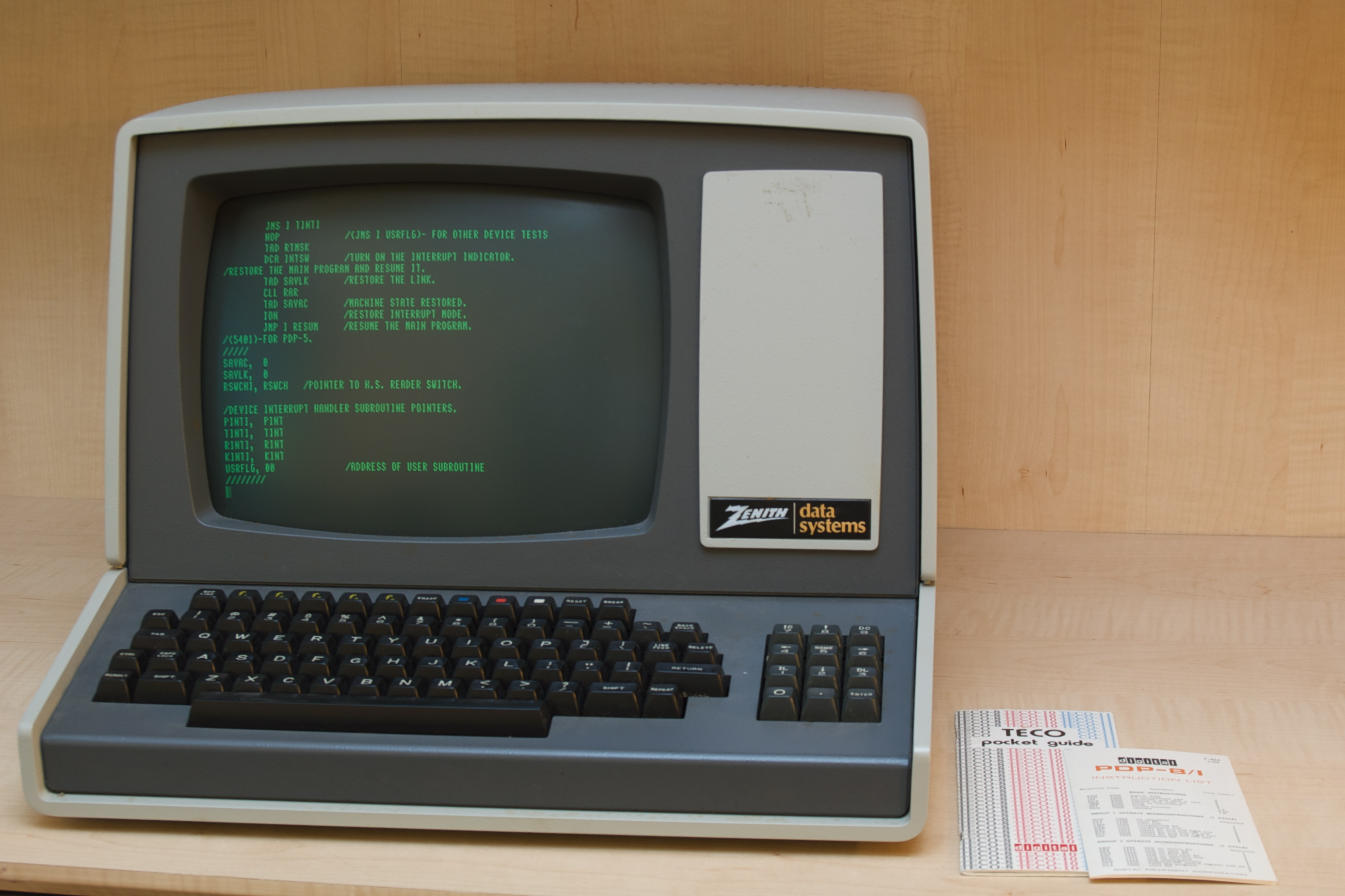
The Zenith Data Systems Z-19 CRT-display terminal

Zenith Data Systems Corporation (ZDS) was founded in October 1979 following the US$64.5-million acquisition of the Heath Company—the only consumer business at Schlumberger—by the Zenith Radio Company. The company's initial headquarters were located in Heath's own headquarters in St. Joseph, Michigan. Edward J. Roberts, who joined the Zenith Radio Company in 1971, was named ZDS's first president. Heath was a manufacturer of microcomputers and do-it-yourself electronics kits, the latter sold under the Heathkit brand; meanwhile, Zenith Radio Company (later Zenith Electronics) had long been a market leader in the American electronics industry, particularly with radios and television sets.

Heath had a loyal customer base of electronics enthusiasts and engineers, and briefly sold an analog computer kit starting in 1957. In 1974 Louis Frenzel and others within Heath suggested a digital computer kit. After the success of the Altair 8800 the company began planning the Heathkit H8, which began shipping in September 1977. When announcing its computers that year, Heath stated that they would soon provide more than 20% of revenue. The first two were H8 based on the Intel 8080 and Heathkit H11 based on the Digital Equipment Corporation LSI-11. H8 runs software on audiotape and punched tape with the H10 puncher–reader. The H8's disk operating system, HDOS, can only read hard-sectored 5.25-inch floppy diskettes.

Zenith's Jerry K. Pearlman said in 1981, "our product charter is, 'If it plugs into a wall in your house and is essentially electronic, Zenith should consider making it, and there should be a big Z on the top.'", with similar "Heathkit" branding for hobbyists. Zenith also expected its cable television hardware business to benefit from acquiring computer expertise, and wanted to gain engineering and software expertise to prepare for rivals that would encroach on Zenith's existing businesses. Acquiring Heath to enter the market for small computers, Zenith intended to sell Heath computers using the Zenith name, through Heath catalogs, Heathkit Electronic Centers, and computer dealers. ZDS's first computers such as the Zenith Z-89 were preassembled versions of Heathkit computers such as the Heath H89. Zenith also wanted to broaden its customer base and use excess capacity in television factories; the ZVM-121 video monitor was designed to match Apple II computers. As subsidiary of a television company, ZDS could obtain monitors at cost.

"Zenith's investment in the company has been greater than that of any prior ownership by a factor of four", Heath president Bill Johnson said in 1982. By fiscal year 1980 computers were 40% of Heath/Zenith sales or about $44 million, and by 1981 computer sales of $71 million grew by 60% annually on average. The company believed that its experience with both televisions and microcomputers was an advantage over IBM which, ZDS said, "has never mass-produced anything". Starting in 1977 with no in-house software expertise until hiring Gordon Letwin, by 1982 ZDS had 100 software developers, aid from the parent company's engineers, 35 salesmen and 24 distributors including ComputerLand, and a factory at Benton Harbor, Michigan with 1200 employees working in three shifts that produced 150 computers daily; represented by the United Steelworkers, they were reportedly the only unionized personal-computer builders in the world.

ZDS built almost 50,000 preassembled and kit computers annually by 1982. Various estimates ranked Heath/Zenith among the five largest personal computer vendors by unit volume in the early 1980s. Zenith stores sold ZDS products, and its network of television service centers repaired ZDS computers. By then preassembled products outsold kit versions four to one. ZDS continued selling computers in kit form under the Heath name as late as 1989; the equivalent of the ZDS Z-150 IBM PC compatible is the Heathkit H-150, for example. The company opened more Heathkit Electronic Centers, which offered Zenith and third-party products, while ZDS served corporate customers. Zenith also continued Heath's practice of publishing unusually clear product documentation, distributing schematics, and selling the source code to HDOS and other software in printed form. By 1981 ZDS supported the CP/M operating system as an alternative to HDOS.

ZDS introduced a number of innovations in the personal computer industry. One unique feature of most ZDS PC-compatible systems is the key combination Ctrl+Alt+Ins, which interrupts the running program and break into a machine-language monitor. This monitor program originated with the Heathkit H8 computer; PAM-8 (Panel Monitor-8), included in ROM, allows the user to trace or resume program execution, change machine settings, run diagnostic routines, and boot from a specific device.

=== Growth (1982-1986) ===
Logo used from 1979 to 1990

Selling kit computers not designed to be shipped preassembled sometimes caused problems. ZDS introduced the Z-100, its first computer not based on a kit design and second 16-bit product after the H11, in 1982. Targeted at business professionals, it has both the Intel 8085 and 8088 microprocessors, five S-100 bus slots for expansion, and integrated high-resolution color graphics. For operating systems, it can boot into either Digital Research's CP/M-85 or Z-DOS, a modified, licensed OEM version of MS-DOS with the latter's filesystem but which is not fully compatible with the MS-DOS API, leading to compatibility issues with certain applications. The Z-100 nonetheless was popular for CP/M developers who wanted to program for both MS-DOS and x86. Later machines in this Z-prefixed line (such as the Z-150 series, the Z-200 series, the Z-300 series, and the Z-400 series) are fully compatible with the IBM PC. The AT-based Z-200 in particular, while not touting many technical improvements over IBM's PC AT, was nonetheless praised for its sturdy construction.

Unlike its parent's television business, ZDS avoided the retail consumer market and television advertising. Despite in the early 1980s pondering a home computer similar to the Atari 8-bit or TI-99/4A, John Frank, vice president of marketing, explained: "We'd like to have [retailers], but we don't need them". While in 1981 small businesses, individual departments at large companies, and the self-employed were the fastest-growing segments for ZDS, by 1985 it focused on large customers such as companies, universities, and government agencies. Government and educational contracts were the most important, representing the bulk of sales efforts. CEO Robert Dilworth said "The Fortune 500 is really just another niche. It's 500 accounts. Compared with our government business, that's really a small number". President Donald Moffett in 1982 stated: "We have no expectations of being first or second in the desktop market", but in fiscal year 1984, ZDS sold 16 percent of the 37,000 computers that the United States government purchased, second to IBM's 27 percent. 1984 revenue doubled from 1983's $125 million.

After nationwide news coverage of a contract with Clarkson College of Technology for a thousand Z-100s to each new class of undergraduate students starting in 1983, 75 other schools made large purchases with ZDS, and more than 250 by 1985. After a failed attempt to sell computers at college bookstores, ZDS found success in marketing to fraternities and sororities directly. By 1985 ZDS was overall the second-largest PC-compatible company, after Compaq. While competitors like Honeywell Information Systems, Tandem Computers, and Data General lost sales by being late to offer compatibles, and priced them comparably to IBM's products, ZDS aggressively competed on price: Its Z-248 costing less than $3000 won a United States Army order over a less-compatible Wang APC that cost $7000. The company won a 1985 contract for 600 computers at Lehigh University because of, a doctoral student wrote, "Zenith's excellent educational discounts".

=== Success (1986-1989) ===
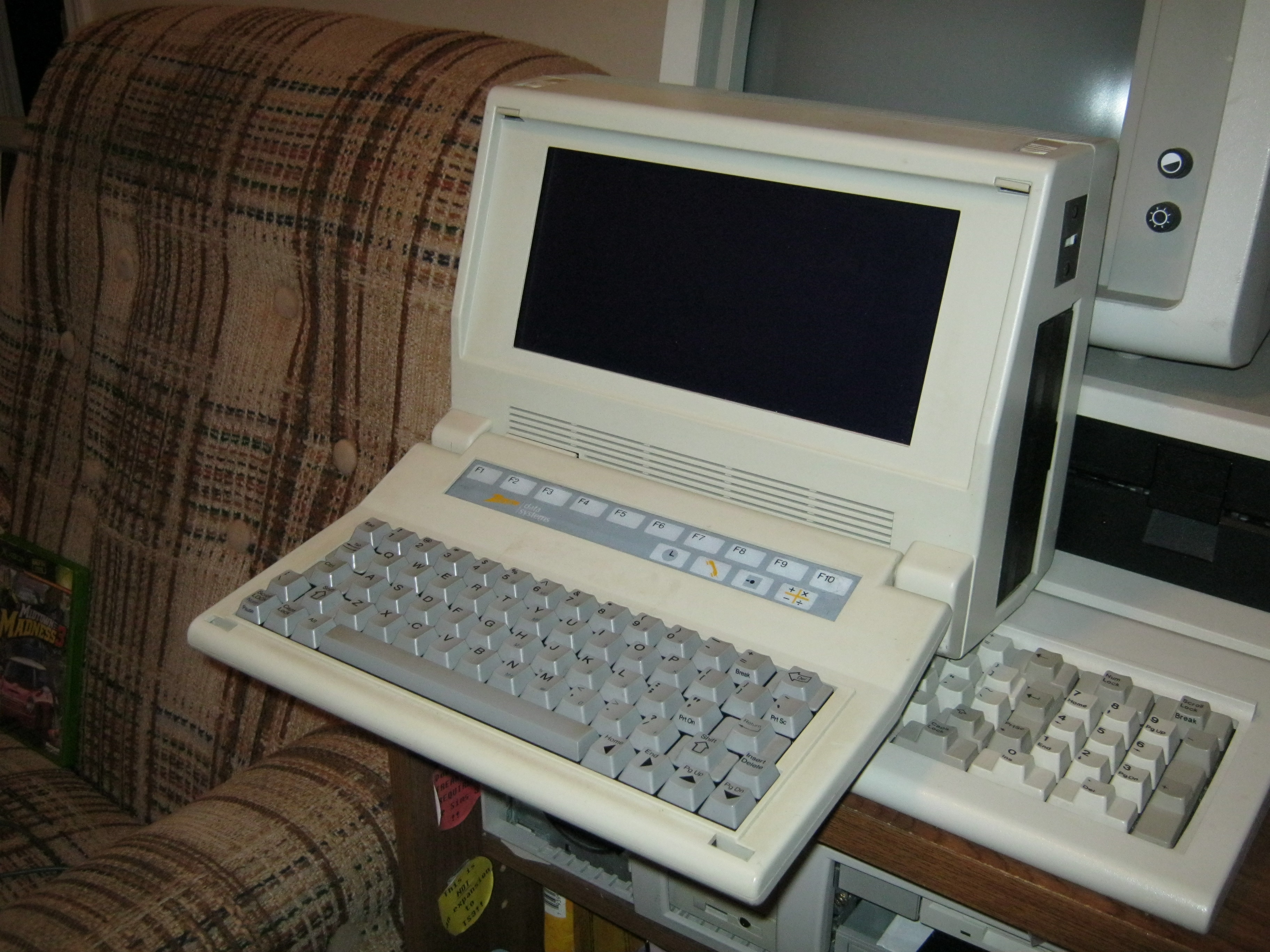
Zenith's Z-171 portable computer, based on the Morrow Pivot II, made headlines when it beat IBM for a contract with the IRS in 1986.

ZDS's 1985 revenue grew to $352 million—one fifth of Zenith's $1.62 billion in revenue—and $550 million in 1986. In March 1986 The New York Times called the division's success one of Zenith Electronics' "proudest accomplishments", amid the parent company's losses in the television market against Japanese competition. Dilworth attributed ZDS's success to using that experience in consumer electronics to understand, unlike other computer companies, that the PC compatible was also a commodity with falling prices: "Basically, we move boxes".

Analysts described federal government contracts as a "lifesaver" for ZDS. It focused on meeting specifications written, Nathan Myhrvold said, to avoid government dependence on IBM. An unusually high percentage of early Heath users were in the military; they used the GI Bill to pay for a correspondence course on computers including building a H89. Heath equipment was compatible with international utility power standards unlike those of other vendors, important for OCONUS assignments. In October 1983, the United States Navy and Air Force awarded a $27-million computer contract to ZDS. In 1984 ZDS won a $100-million contract with the United States military for "eavesdrop-proof" computers compliant with the Tempest standard. In 1986 it won two other large contracts, one for portable computers for the Internal Revenue Service (IRS), and a $242 million contract—the largest computer contract the U.S. federal government had awarded—for 90,000 Z-200 AT-compatible computers to the United States Department of Defense (DoD). IBM had been favored to win the IRS contract. In 1987 it won another record-setting DoD bid, beating Toshiba Information Systems for a $104.5 million contract for 90,000 Z-181 laptops; by then competitors found defeating ZDS for government contracts difficult. When Dilworth left for a startup that year, Computerworld described ZDS as "having made its name selling ... compatibles to the federal government and education markets".

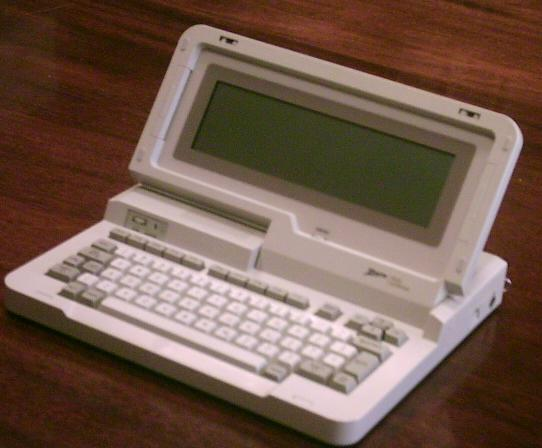
Zenith's ZP-150, released in 1984, was one among the first wave of laptop computers.

ZDS's ZP-150 laptop, released in 1984, was an early entry in the first wave of laptops of the early 1980s. ZDS followed up the Z-150 with the heavier, less-elegant Z-138 portable computer in 1985. The company quickly followed this up with the Z-160 portable, which featured pop-up 5.25-inch disk drives. Also in 1985, the company introduced the Z-148, one of the most inexpensive IBM PC-compatibles on the market at the time, with a suggested retail price of $2,200 (with typical resellers discounts lowering this figure substantially, according to InfoWorld). The Z-148 was kept inexpensive by its small footprint; one sacrifice was the lack of any ISA expansion slots. The company's Z-171 portable was built into a lunchbox form factor. This computer was originally developed by Morrow Designs and sold as the Morrow Pivot II in May 1985. ZDS acquired the rights to co-manufacture the Pivot II rebadged as the Z-171 and unveiled the latter in November 1985. The 1986 IRS contract was for 20,000 Z-171s worth $27 million, chosen over the PC Convertible.

ZDS's $70 million in estimated operating income in 1987 from about $1 billion in sales contrasted with a pretax loss of $29 million for Zenith overall, because of continued intense competition in the television market. That year Microsoft chose ZDS to be the first pack-in distributor of its variant of OS/2 1.0, co-developed with IBM; Microsoft also developed a character-based windowing file manager for ZDS's all-in-one Eazy PC called MS-DOS Manager, a precursor to Microsoft's later DOS Shell. In 1988, the company released the SupersPort line of laptops and the TurbosPort 386 portable computer, the latter being one of the first computers to have a "paper-white" monochrome LCD, owing to the use of a special STN display technology and a cold-cathode backlight. The SupersPort was very successful for ZDS, with the company reportedly selling over 173,000 units, cornering between 23 and 25 percent of the entire laptop market at the time; Hewlett-Packard, a SupersPort reseller, said that the ZDS computer was faster and had more features than its own. Contracts to sell fleets of computers to the United States Air Force and the IRS further increased ZDS's status as a leading computer manufacturer. By 1988's end it was the top portable-computer vendor in the United States, grossed $1.4 billion in revenues, shipped an estimated 433,000 computers in the US (up 14% year over year) with 4.8% of the market, and was a member of the Gang of Nine top clonemakers that challenged IBM with their Extended Industry Standard Architecture. Zenith was, meanwhile, reportedly attempting to sell its consumer television business. ZDS's success allowed it to sponsor the Full Members' Cup, a football competition in the United Kingdom, starting in 1989 until the latter's discontinuation in 1992.

=== Faltering, and sale to Groupe Bull (1989–1991) ===
Despite its leadership of the portable market—far more successful than IBM itself—and what Byte described in 1989 as "an excellent reputation for making quality hardware" with good customer support, by that year the company deemphasized retail sales at Heath/Zenith stores, prioritizing outside sales. Its MinisPort subnotebook, which made use of a special 2-inch floppy disk format as the primary means of transferring data to and from the machine, sold more slowly than anticipated. Further, Unisys beat out ZDS in a $700-million bid to supply the military with desktop computer systems. The company soon after had a $534-million computer upgrade contract for the Navy cancelled by the General Services Administration. A ploy to boost sales of its desktop computers by requiring its laptop dealers to also sell desktop models backfired, with an estimated 1,000 dealers across the United States including ComputerLand pulling all ZDS products from their inventory in protest of this policy. Zenith Electronics cut spending to ZDS's research and development operations in preparation for selling the subsidiary to the highest bidder. This had the effect of eliminating new product releases, causing sales to greatly decline as existing offerings became obsolete. The company shipped 386,100 computers in 1989, down 11% year over year; Zenith's 4.2% market share declined by 60bp. An interested buyer was found at the very end of the decade; in November 1989, Groupe Bull announced that it would acquire ZDS from Zenith Electronics for between $511 million and $635 million. The deal was finalized in December 1989.

=== Pesatori's tenure (1991–1993) ===
ZDS's workforce peaked in number in 1990 with 3,800 workers, 1,800 of which were from the St. Joseph, Michigan, headquarters. Under new ownership, the company relocated from Michigan to Buffalo Grove, Illinois, after leasing 140,000 square feet (13,000 m^{2}) of office space at a newly built 12-story office building at Lake-Cook Road and Milwaukee Avenue. ZDS retained the old St. Joseph headquarters, refactoring it into a full-on engineering facility and manufacturing plant for the company's desktop computers. US shipments of 204,500 computers decreased by 47% year over year in 1990, however. The company's 2.2% market share declined by 200bp.

Observers said that in addition to the 1989-1991 collapse of its network of distributors from forcing them to sell all ZDS products, the company trying to cater to both government and commercial customers hurt sales in 1990. They were unsure whether ZDS could again be a leader in portable computers, with one analyst describing new product announcements at June 1991 Comdex "a bet-the-company announcement" and another describing it as "too little, too late". After shuffling its executive team in 1990, Enrico Pesatori was named the first permanent CEO of ZDS under Bull's ownership in January 1991. Tasked with correcting course and rehabilitating ZDS's public image, Pesatori spearheaded the creation of a new lineup of laptops and put an end to the requirement that dealers stock desktops as well as laptops. Pesatori's new team meanwhile increased the company's advertising budget by half and launched a new advertising campaign targeting business users. ZDS also continued to expand distribution channels and renewed the relationship with ComputerLand. As a result, sales started to improve. The company increased shipments from 194,000 units in 1990 to 228,000 units in 1991 (down from 445,000 units in 1988). The company also increased investments in research and development, with expenditures in 1991 being 25 percent higher than the previous year, this trend following apace for 1992. By the middle of 1992, ZDS had additional manufacturing plants in Santa Clara, California; Billerica, Massachusetts; and Villeneuve-d'Ascq, France.

ZDS remained the largest supplier of computers to the federal government into 1991. In November that year, it and several other large computer companies, including Apple, lost a bid to supply the Department of Defense with 300,000 desktop computers, the winning bid valuated at $1 billion split between rival manufacturer CompuAdd Corporation of Austin, Texas, and systems integrator Sysorex Information Systems of Falls Church, Virginia. ZDS however won a bid to supply the Pentagon with 300,000 desktops worth $740 million in September 1992, this time beating out CompuAdd and Sysorex. Although ZDS's bid was temporarily voided after the latter two companies raised suspicions that ZDS was financially unstable, ZDS won back the contract in May 1993 on judicial appeal.

Besides closing the Heath stores—by then renamed "Heath/Zenith Computers"—in March 1992, ZDS that year launched a revamp of desktop PCs, laptops, and monitors. The redesign extended to products' case designs, featuring sleek lines meant to instill a sense of modernity. These efforts culminated in the release of the Z-Series laptops in June 1992. The Z-Series were touted as the lightest laptops available at the time, with built-in networking capability and color LCDs. The Z-Lite, the company's second attempt at a subnotebook, was co-designed by Frog of Germany, featuring an 8.5-inch LCD while weighing only 3.9 pounds (1.8 kg). ZDS themselves were commissioned to design and manufacture another company's product, the ThinkPad 300—IBM's second entry in the ThinkPad line of notebook computers.

The total sales for 1992 were estimated at $900 million—55 percent of which represented sales in Europe, and 40 percent of which represented sales from notebook models. While the company's overall sales slowly recovered, ZDS's retail market share continued to slide, decreasing from 3.4 percent in July 1991 to only 1 percent in July 1992. The company's officials cited a change in consumer purchasing behavior favoring superstore outlets (a sales channel in which ZDS had only a limited presence) as a reason for this decline. In an attempt to boost sales into 1993, ZDS restructured its field sales force and began focusing on direct sales to corporate accounts. In August 1992, after having poached CompuAdd executive Jerry Baldwin, ZDS launched the Z-Direct mail order catalog, mailing one million copies of its inaugural issue that year. The catalog offered desktop, server, and notebook products via a toll-free phone number. The catalog also included peripheral equipment from other manufacturers and software products from Microsoft, Novell, and Lotus Development. The company hoped that the direct sales approach would increase brand recognition and reach customers who were not targeted by other marketing channels.

=== Noels' tenure and final years (1993–1996) ===
Jacques Noels, formerly the head of Nokia Consumer Electronics, replaced Pesatori as CEO in January 1993. Pesatori meanwhile left to helm Digital Equipment Corporation's PC-compatible systems division. Under Noels' leadership, ZDS launched several new products, including the Z-Lite 425L, an upgraded version of its subnotebook featuring an i486SL processor clocked at 25 MHz; the Z-Notepad, a pen-enabled version of the Z-Note laptop; and the Z-Star V33VL series, a 486-based notebook PC line comprising three models, all featuring Cyrix's energy-conservant Cx486SLC microprocessor clocked at 33 MHz. ZDS also launched a new series of desktop PCs, the Z-Select 100 line, which came pre-installed with networking software compatible with Novell NetWare, Banyan VINES, and Microsoft LAN Manager. The Z-Select 100 was powered by a 25-MHz i486SX processor and featured 4 MB of RAM and a 170-MB hard drive. ZDS touted the power-saving capabilities of the Z-Select 100, including its idle power consumption of 60 watts and advanced power management capabilities, including user-definable time intervals on which the computer halts the processor to conserve power.

In 1993, Groupe Bull purchased a 19.9 percent stake in Packard Bell, then the fourth-largest PC seller in the United States (behind Apple, IBM, and Compaq), representing an undisclosed price. While Packard Bell had an overall market share in the United States of 37 percent, only five percent of this figure represented notebook sales—much lower than the industry average of roughly 20 percent. As part of the acquisition, ZDS agreed to provide Packard Bell with rebadged versions of its notebook and subnotebook PCs, eventually manufacturing for them the Packard Bell Statesman, released in October 1993. The two companies also agreed to collaborate on the design and production of future desktop PCs. ZDS reported a 30 percent increase in worldwide revenues by 1993's end, with North American revenues up 53 percent and European revenues up 22 percent. The number of units shipped also increased, with a rise of 89 percent in the US and 62 percent worldwide. ZDS by this point counted seven major distributors on its roster and had sales networks in over 30 countries.

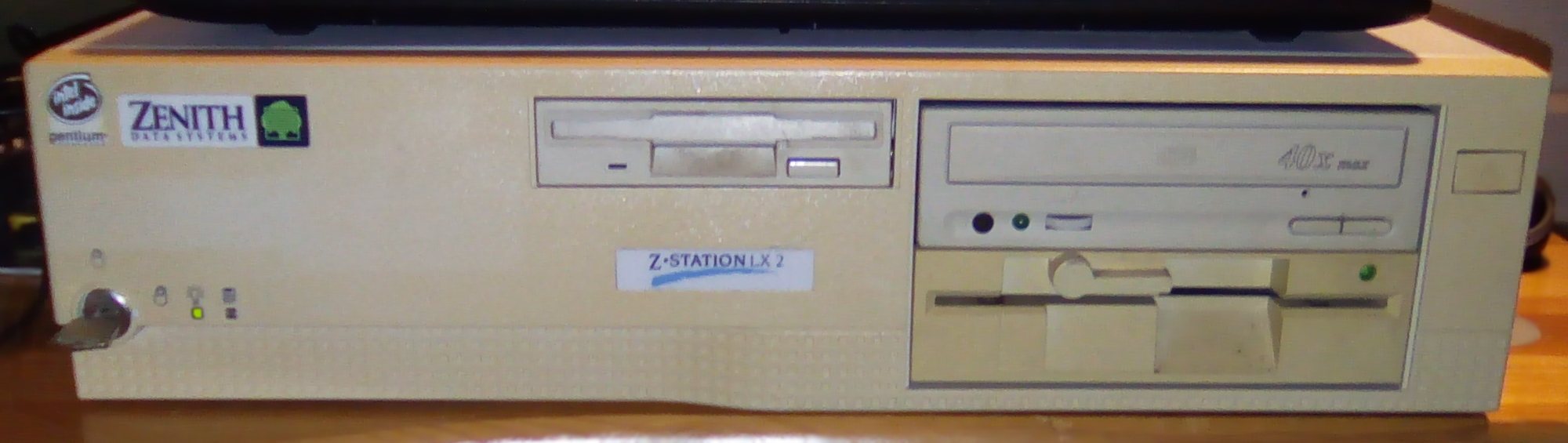
The Zenith Data Systems Z-Station LX 2, a Pentium-based desktop computer from 1995

In 1994, ZDS unveiled the Z-Stor line of wide area network products. The flagship product in the lineup was the Z-Stor Personal Server, a file server co-developed by the Desktop Workgroup Computing Initiative, a joint venture between ZDS and Novell. ZDS in 1994 also introduced the Z-Station 500, a desktop workstation, and the Z-Noteflex, a new line of notebooks. The Z-Station 500 touted improved power management, higher-specification graphics cards (implementing ATI's PCI-based Mach 32 card), and increased system performance. The Z-Noteflex meanwhile was designed to be modular, allowing users to swap the top housing of the laptop to switch between different display technologies (passive-matrix monochrome, passive-matrix color, and active-matrix, TFT color) and remove hard disk drives toollessly. The Z-Noteflex also possessed an internal VESA local bus, allowing expansion cards based on this architecture to be installed into the computer with the optional Flexshow docking station.

ZDS saw considerable growth in revenue in the North American and European markets in the beginning of 1994. Comparing year-to-year first quarter profits between 1993 and 1994, there was an increase of 132 percent in North America and an increase of 42 percent in Europe. ZDS's annual sales revenues of roughly $1 billion made up around 40 percent of Groupe Bull's total hardware revenues, according to a statement issued by the company. Furthermore, ZDS revenues were equally divided between North American and European markets, as well as between desktop and notebook products.

=== Acquisition by Packard Bell (1996) ===
In February 1996, Packard Bell acquired Zenith Data Systems from Groupe Bull, in a three-way deal which saw Groupe Bull and Japanese electronics conglomerate NEC increasing their existing stakes in Packard Bell. As a consequence of the merger, 570 jobs were eliminated from ZDS's plant in St. Joseph. Shortly after, in June 1996, NEC announced that it would acquire Packard Bell, merging it with NEC's global personal computer operations. The merger was finalized in July 1996; the resulting division became known as Packard Bell NEC, selling computer systems under both NEC and Packard Bell faceplates. Select ZDS employees moved to Packard Bell NEC's headquarters in Sacramento, California, and ZDS lived on as a brand for certain systems manufactured by Packard Bell NEC and marketed in the United States between 1996 and 1999. For a brief period, Packard Bell NEC was the largest PC manufacturer, in terms of units shipped, in the United States, with 15 percent of market share; it was also the third largest PC vendor in the world in terms of sales at the end of 1996. However, Packard Bell NEC's market share would soon slide, and the company between 1997 and 1998 posted losses totaling more than $1 billion. In 1999, NEC withdrew Packard Bell NEC from the American market, while keeping it in Europe. Acer Inc. of Taiwan eventually acquired Packard Bell in 2008.

== Computers ==
Some Zenith Data Systems computer models, by year of introduction:

- 1980: Z-89
- 1981: Z-100 Series
- 1982: Z-120; Z-138
- 1984: ZP-150; Z-160
- 1985: Z-160 Portable; Z-148; Z-158; Z-168; Z-171
- 1986: Z-200 Series; Z-181
- 1987: SupersPort; Zenith Eazy PC
- 1988: ZDS 181
- 1989: ZDS 286 LP Plus; MinisPort
- 1990: ZDS 386 SX; Z-400 Series
- 1991: ZDS 486
- 1992: Viva Series
- 1993: Z-Star Notebook Series
- 1994: Z-Station Series
- 1995: CruisePad; Z-star ES
