= VAXmate =

1986 personal computer

- Developer: Digital Equipment Corporation
- Type: IBM PC/AT compatible personal computer
- Released: September 1986; 39 years ago
- CPU: Intel 80286 @ 8 MHz
- Memory: 1 Mbyte of RAM (could be expanded by 2 MB with another option to 3 MB)
- Storage: Optional expansion box containing either 20 MB or 40 MB hard disk
- Removable storage: 1.2 MB RX33 5¼-inch floppy disk drive
- Display: Amber or green monochrome CRT
- Input: Mouse and LK250 keyboard
- Connectivity: Thinwire Ethernet interface; internal modem available in North America
- Predecessor: Rainbow 100
- Successor: DECstation 200 and 300

VAXmate was an IBM PC/AT compatible personal computer introduced by Digital Equipment Corporation in September, 1986. The replacement to the Rainbow 100, in its standard form it was the first commercial diskless personal computer.

== OS and files ==
The operating system and files could be served from a VAX/VMS server running the company's VAX/VMS Services for MS-DOS software, which went through several name changes, finally becoming Pathworks. Alternatively an optional expansion box containing either 20 MB or 40 MB hard disk could be purchased which allowed it to operate as a more conventional stand-alone PC.

== Original specifications ==
The basic system contained an 8 MHz Intel 80286 CPU with 1 Mbyte of RAM, a 1.2 MB RX33 5¼-inch floppy disk drive, a 14-inch (diagonal) amber or green monochrome CRT and a thinwire Ethernet interface all contained in the system unit. It was also provided with a serial printer port and a serial communications port. A separate mouse and LK250 keyboard were used with the device.

As well as the expansion box, an 80287 numeric coprocessor could be ordered as an option, and the memory could be expanded by 2 MB with another option to 3 MB. In North America, an internal modem was also available.

== DECstation ==
It was superseded by the DECstation 200 and 300 in January 1989.
