= LK421 =

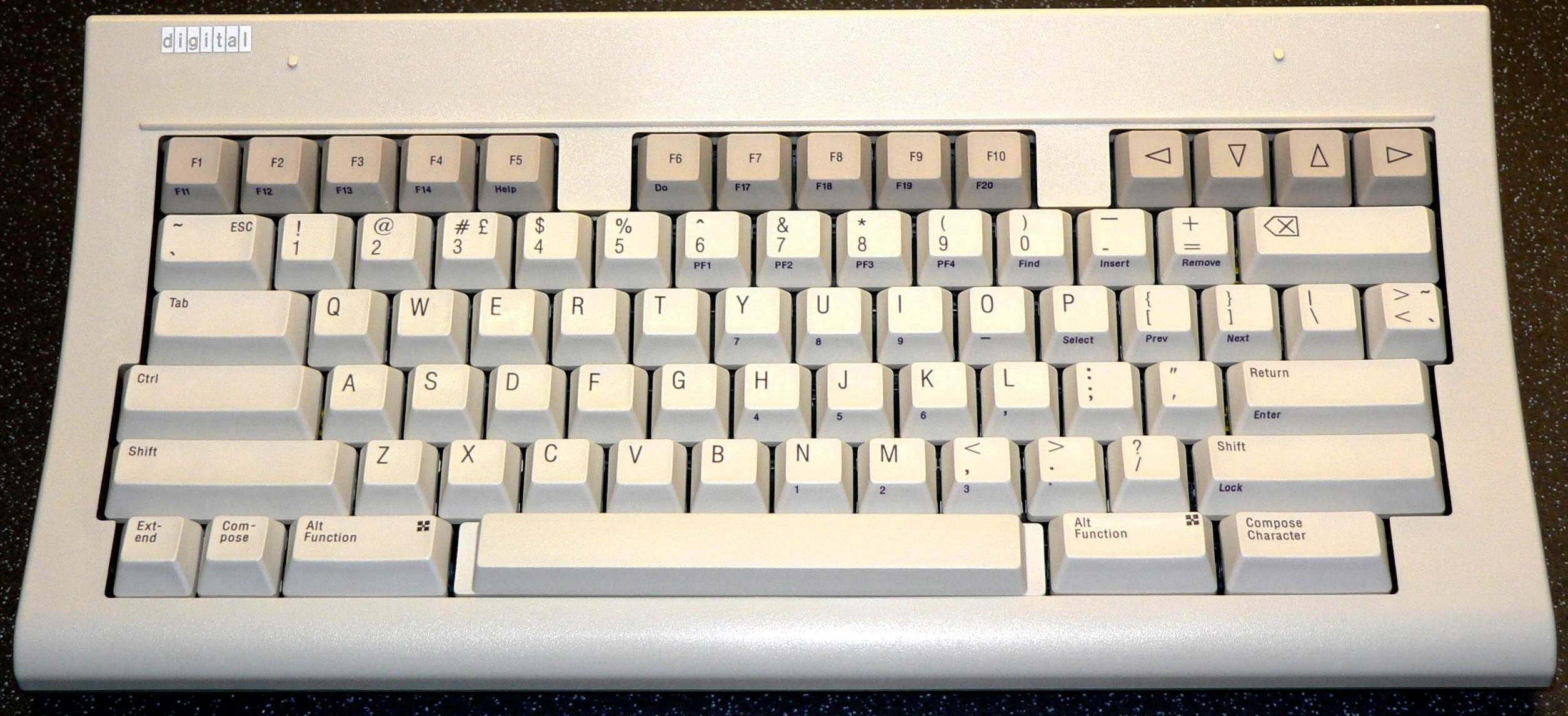

The LK421 was a detachable computer keyboard manufactured by Digital Equipment Corporation of Maynard, Massachusetts and supplied as an option to the standard LK401 keyboard with their DEC 3000 AXP workstations. The keyboard is optimized for use with the Digital Unix line of operating systems, instead of the OpenVMS operating system for which the LK401 was more suitable.

The keyboard is notable for the standard position of the Control key for use with Unix operating systems and an Escape key. The keyboard has two compose keys. There is no separate numeric keypad or edit key group. The functionality of the missing keys is implemented by some standard keys having a dual function. The user holds down the Extend key and presses the key with the appropriate legend on the front of a standard key to access the additional functions.
