= Ardence =

Ardence, a Citrix Company
- Company type: Private
- Industry: Computer software
- Founded: 1980
- Headquarters: Waltham, Massachusetts
- Area served: Worldwide
- Key people: Stephen M. Woodard, Vice President, Product Line Executive, OEM/Embedded Group
- Number of employees: 104 (2006)
- Website: www.ardence.com
- Footnotes / references Formerly: Ardence, Inc., VenturCom

Ardence was a software company headquartered in Waltham, Massachusetts with representatives in Washington, D.C.; Virginia Beach, VA; Chicago, IL; Denton, TX; and in Europe, the Middle East, Africa and India. It developed a software-streaming product and an embedded OEM development platform. It was founded in 1980 as VenturCom.

On December 20, 2006, Citrix Systems Inc. announced an agreement to acquire Ardence. In 2008, some former Ardence executives acquired the Ardence programs from Citrix and formed IntervalZero.

== History ==
VenturCom was founded in 1980, by Marc H. Meyer, Doug Mook, Bill Spencer and Myron Zimmerman. The company changed its name to Ardence in 2004.

On December 20, 2006, Citrix Systems Inc. announced an agreement to acquire Ardence.

In 2008, a group of former Ardence executives founded IntervalZero and acquired the Ardence embedded software business from Citrix. Citrix retained a minority ownership the firm.

== Products ==
The enterprise software-streaming product deployed Microsoft Windows, SUSE Linux, Red Hat Linux and Turbolinux operating systems, along with all their applications, on demand from networked storage. It allowed any x86-based computer - desktop, server, or device - to be provisioned, or re-provisioned from bare metal.

The core technology behind the software streaming product was a device driver for the selected operating system, which mounts a virtual disk over a custom UDP protocol. Basically, computers were configured to netboot a kernel that contained this device driver.

== Awards ==
In 2005, Ardence won the ComputerWorld Horizon Award.

In 2006, Ardence won the CRN Best In Show Award at IBM PartnerWorld.

== See also ==
- Venix
