= Zenith ZP-150 =

ZP-150
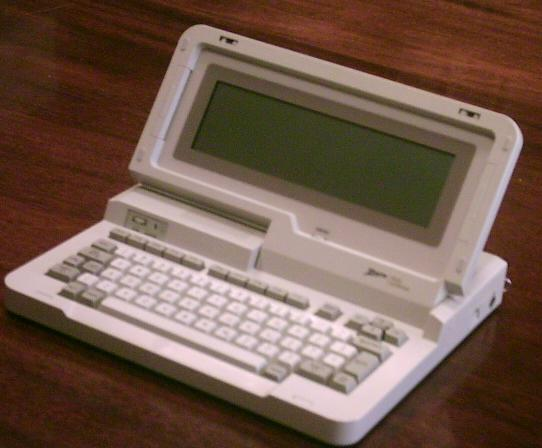
- Developer: Zenith Data Systems
- Manufacturer: Zenith Data Systems
- Type: Laptop
- Released: 1984
- Operating system: System Manager
- CPU: Intel 80C88
- Memory: 224 KB
- Display: LCD, 80 x 16 characters
- Successor: Z-181, Z-183

The ZP-150 was one of the earliest commercially available laptops. It was released in late 1984 by Zenith Data Systems.

== Market life ==
The ZP-150 was offered for US$1,995 when bundled with the US$800 Microsoft Works software, but could be found in the Fall 1985 Heathkit catalog for US$1,195. The price came down to US$999 in the Winter 1986 edition of the same catalog and US$699 in the Fall 1987 edition, as it was being phased out with the release of the Z-181 and Z-183. The main target market was the U.S. government and "the mobile executive", for on-site applications. Its relatively small dimensions and light weight allowed it to be easily carried in a standard briefcase or the included carrying case.

== Hardware specifications ==
- Weight: 7.7 lb (3.5 kg)
- Dimensions: 13"W × 11.1"D × 1.8"H
- RAM: 32K, expandable to 416K
- ROM: 224K, plus 2 sockets for software expansion
- CPU: Intel 80C88
- Power: 12VDC or 10 AA alkaline batteries (providing 15 hours run-time w/o modem), plus internal nickel-cadmium battery for retaining memory while off, up to 8 days
- Ports:

Parallel printer
RS-232C
Telephone line (300 baud modem)
System bus
BCR (for a bar code reader)
CMT (for data cassette recorder)
ACP (for acoustic coupler)
Handset (of telephone)

- LCD (80 characters/line with 16 lines), contrast control, volume control, and low-battery indicator
- 75-key typewriter-style keyboard

The stock 32K RAM could hold up to 10 typewritten pages. The main methods of file transfer were via the modem or the RS-232C port and a file transfer program.

== Software specifications ==
The ZP-150 came with a built-in System Manager and calculator program, as well as a special version of Microsoft Works 1.10 stored in ROM. Most programs are very similar to the desktop versions, but with reduced functionality.

Word word processor
Plan electronic spreadsheet, similar to Multiplan (spreadsheet size up to 255 rows x 63 columns)
Calendar appointment organizer with alarm
File database manager
Telcom telecommunications package
BASIC program editor and compiler

== Accessories ==
- ZP-150-1 power transformer
- ZP-150-2 32K RAM module
- ZP-150-4 Parallel to Centronics printer cable
- CB-5063-27 File transfer software

== Historical significance ==
The most significant aspect of the ZP-150's history is that it is not remembered as one of the first portable computers, despite its relatively early appearance in the marketplace and being referred to in advertising as a "laptop". Like the IBM PC and Apple II computers, the ZP-150 was quickly copied. The most well-known clone is the Tandy 600, which was very similar in packaging, software, and hardware except for the addition of a floppy drive and the lacking of BASIC. This was not the first laptop that Tandy manufactured, but was one in the TRS-80 line.

== See also ==
- History of computing hardware
- Laptop
