= Heathkit H11 =

Personal computer released in 1978

- Manufacturer: Heathkit
- Type: Personal computer
- Released: 1978; 48 years ago
- Introductory price: US$1295 (equivalent to $6,392 in 2025) (kit) or US$1595 (equivalent to $7,873 in 2025) (assembled)
- Discontinued: 1982
- Media: optional 8-inch floppy disks, optional paper tape
- Operating system: optional HT-11
- CPU: LSI-11 clocked at 2.5 MHz
- Memory: 4kword base system, maximum optional 32kword RAM, 8kword ROM (2 bytes/word)
- Related: PDP-11

The Heathkit H11 Computer is an early kit-format personal computer introduced in 1978. It is essentially a Digital Equipment PDP-11 in a small-form-factor case, designed by Heathkit. The H11 is one of the first 16-bit personal computers, at a list price of US$1,295, (equivalent to $6,392 in 2025) but it also requires at least a computer terminal and some form of storage to make it useful. It was too expensive for most Heathkit customers, and was discontinued in 1982.

== Background ==
The Heath Company, makers of electronic kits, announced its first two digital computers in 1977, including the H11 and less-expensive Heathkit H8. The company hoped that computers would soon provide more than 20% of revenue.

== Specifications ==
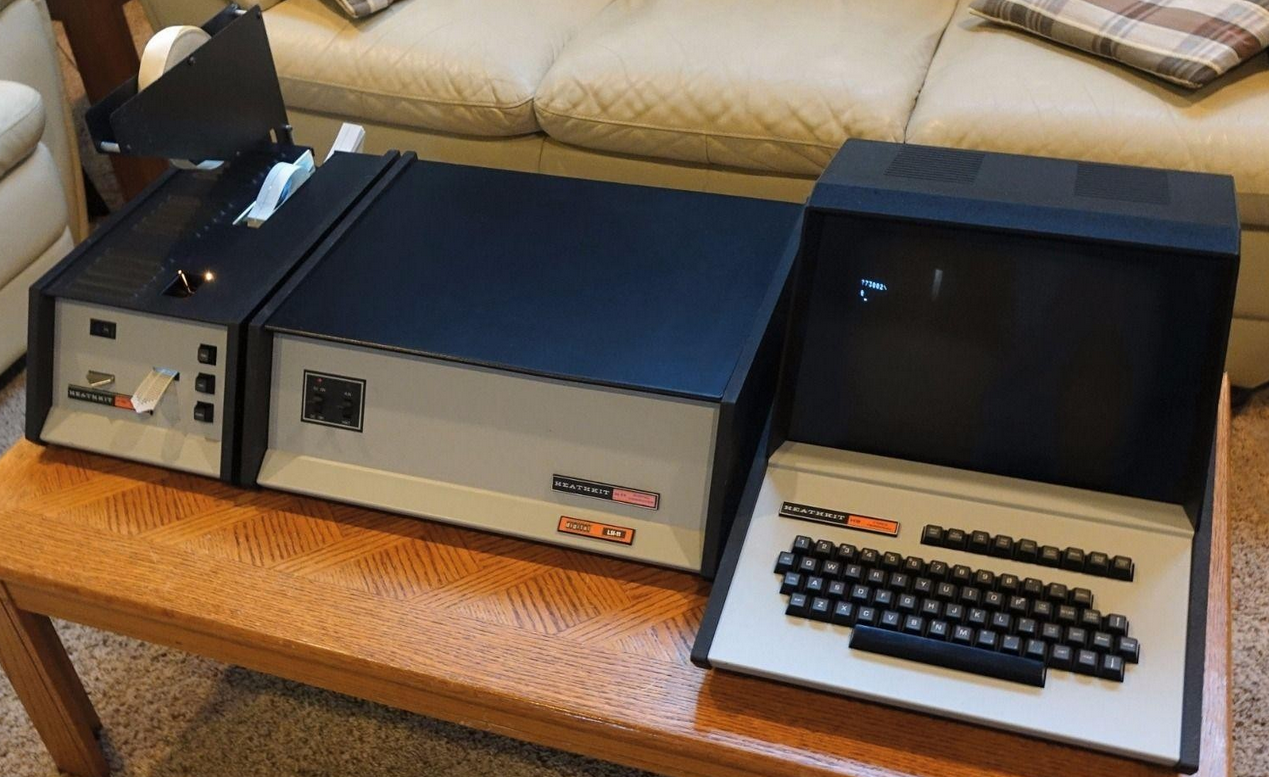
H10 paper tape reader, H11 minicomputer, and H9 video terminal.

The H11 features:

- Processor – LSI-11 (KD11-HA half-size or "double-height" card)
- Speed – 2.5 MHz
- ROM – 8 kWords (16 KB) (max)
- RAM – 32 kWords (64 KB) (max)
- Slots – 7 Q-bus slots
- Storage – H27 8-inch floppy drive (2 256 KB 8-inch single sided drives) or H10 paper tape
- I/O – serial (RS-232) or parallel ports
- Operating system – HT-11 (a simplified version of RT-11)
- Instruction set – PDP-11/40 instruction set
- Languages – BASIC, Focal and others

H11 owners were eligible for DECUS membership, giving them access to that organization's library of software. Initial memory limitations restrict the selection of system software, but the system RAM can be expanded to 32 kWords x 16 bit. Many PDP-11 operating systems and programs run without trouble. The system will also work with most DEC PDP-11 equipment, including many Q-bus compatible peripherals.

The H11 did not sell well. After discontinuation, a Heath/Zenith executive at a 1982 convention of Heath/Zenith owners told "a lonely H11 fan" that the new Zenith Z-100 "could run rings around the H11 ... The H11 is Sixties technology".

== See also ==
- Elektronika BK
- Heathkit H8
