= HDOS =

Computer operating system

- Developer: Heath Company / Gordon Letwin, Richard Musgrave
- Working state: Discontinued
- Source model: Open source
- Initial release: 1978; 48 years ago
- Latest release: 3.02
- Available in: English
- Supported platforms: Heathkit H8, Heathkit H89, Zenith Z-89
- License: Public domain

HDOS is a microcomputer disk operating system, originally written for the 1977 Heathkit H8 computer system and later also available for the Heathkit H89 and Zenith Z-89 computers. The author was Heath Company employee Gordon Letwin, who later was an early employee of Microsoft and lead architect of OS/2.

HDOS originally came with a limited set of system software tools, including an assembler, but many commercial and large set of freeware programs from HUG (Heath User Group) became available for it eventually.

HDOS 2.0 was one of the first microcomputer operating systems to use loadable device drivers to achieve a degree of device independence and extensibility. Device names followed the RSX-11-style convention of DKn: where the first two letters were the device driver file name and n was a number (DK0:, DK1:, and so on would all be handled by DK.SYS). Other similarities to RSX included the use of PIP for file transfer, and the use of EOT for file termination.

Similar to how Heath/Zenith published complete schematics and part lists for its computers, the company sold to users the source code for HDOS. for about $200. Item references (Heathkit part number) are HOS-1-SL part number 595–2466.

Heath/Zenith also offered the widely used CP/M as an alternative operating system. Although differing in design and internals, CP/M and HDOS are technically comparable and sold for the same price. One difference is the far greater number of CP/M applications. In January 1979, Lifeboat Associates announced a H8-compatible version of CP/M. By late that year Heath admitted that the company should have used CP/M from the beginning; from 1981 CP/M officially became the company's preferred 8-bit operating system. When the 16-bit Zenith Z-100 shipped in 1982 with CP/M and Z-DOS, a variant of MS-DOS, the company cited the many applications being developed for the latter for its decision.

== Commands ==
The following list of commands are supported by HDOS.

- BOOT
- BYE
- CAT
- COPY
- DATE
- DELETE
- DISMOUNT
- FLAGS
- HELP
- MOUNT
- ONECOPY
- PIP
- RENAME
- RUN
- SET
- STAT
- STATUS
- TYPE
- VER

== Versions ==
- HDOS 1.0 – written in 1978 by J. Gordon Letwin
- HDOS 1.5 – Gregg Chandler
- HDOS 1.6 – Gregg Chandler
- HDOS 2.0 – released in 1980, written by Gregg Chandler, released into the public domain in April 1988
- HDOS 3.0 – released into the public domain in August 1986
- HDOS 3.02 – enhanced version by Richard Musgrave

== See also ==
- Heathkit
- Zenith Data Systems
- List of operating systems
