= Lafayette Radio Electronics =

American radio and electronics manufacturer and retailer

Lafayette Radio Electronics Corporation
- Uppercase letters and a picture of Marquis de Lafayette were commonly used as Lafayette's logo through the 1960s and '70s
- Type: Public
- Industry: Retail
- Founded: 1931
- Defunct: 1981
- Fate: Bankruptcy
- Headquarters: Syosset, New York

Lafayette Radio Electronics Corporation was an American radio and electronics manufacturer and retailer from approximately 1931 to 1981, headquartered in Syosset, New York, a Long Island suburb of New York City. The company sold radio sets, Amateur radio (Ham) equipment, citizens band (CB) radios and related communications equipment, electronic components, microphones, public address systems, and tools through their company owned and branded chain of retail outlets and by mail-order.

== History ==
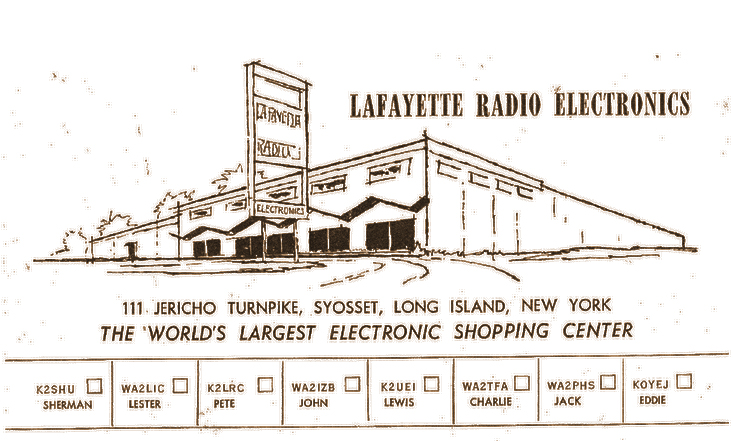
Lafayette Radio Electronics, QSL card for use by headquarters staff amateur radio operators.

"Wholesale Radio Service" was established in the early 1920s by Abraham Pletman in New York City. Radios sold by the company were trademarked “Lafayette” in July 1931. Following a Federal Trade Commission action in 1935, Wholesale Radio Service became "Radio Wire Television, Inc.". A 1939 company catalog bore the names Radio Wire Television Co. Inc. and "Lafayette Radio Corporation". In 1948, the company issued a catalog under the name “Lafayette-Concord” and called itself the “world’s largest radio supply organization”. In 1952, a catalog was issued using only the Lafayette name.

Lafayette Radio Electronics (LRE) soon became a thriving mail-order catalog business; the electronic components it sold were useful to amateur radio operators and electronic hobbyists in areas where such components were unavailable in local retail outlets. Lafayette's main competitors were Radio Shack, Allied Radio, Heathkit, and "mom and pop" (independent) radio dealers throughout the United States. Early Lafayette Radio stores were located in Jamaica, N.Y. and Manhattan in the mid-1950s. The electronics kits were produced in the Jamaica facility.

Lafayette advertised heavily in major U.S. consumer electronics magazines of the 1960s and 1970s, particularly Audio, High Fidelity, Popular Electronics, Popular Mechanics, and Stereo Review. The company offered a free 400-page catalog filled with descriptions of vast quantities of electronic gear, including microphones, speakers, tape recorders, and other components.

In 1981, Lafayette Radio entered Chapter 11 bankruptcy and sold its New York area stores to Circuit City.

== Retail stores ==
Until the 1960s, many independent retailers in some markets became Lafayette Radio "Associate Stores", which were displaced when the company expanded. These stores were supported from headquarters at 111 Jericho Turnpike in Syosset, NY and a warehouse in Hauppauge, NY. A limited selection of product was stocked, with full access to a catalog with a wide variety of parts, tubes, cameras, musical instruments, kits, gadgets and branded gear that could be ordered and delivered through the local store. The company made major investments in what were called sound rooms to demonstrate hi-fi equipment, using custom switch panels and acoustic treatments in an attempt to duplicate a home listening environment and offer fair comparison with an assortment of branded hi-fi gear.

Managers were rewarded for maximizing gross profit margins and inventory "turns", which led to frequent out-of-stock situations, often remedied by frequent cross-town inter-store transfers. Each store had a repair shop on site with a part-time technician. Some locations had multiple full-time service technicians. Others had service departments that operated independently of the store but under the same ownership. Stores ranged in size from 2,000 to 5,000 square feet (460 m^{2}).

By the late 1970s, Lafayette expanded to major markets across the country, struggling to compete with Radio Shack, which was purchased by Tandy Leather Co. in 1963. Lafayette ran into major financial difficulty when the Federal Communications Commission (FCC) expanded a new citizens band radio ("CB") spectrum to 40 channels in 1977. Lafayette's buyers had firm commitments to accept delivery of thousands of older design units capable of only 23 channels, and were not able to liquidate the inventory without taking a serious loss. Eventually, all of the old CB radios were sold for under $40.

With fewer than 100 stores, far fewer than the aggressively expanding Radio Shack's thousands of local outlets, Lafayette Radio remained more of a dedicated enthusiasts' store than a mass marketer. The company was also hurt by the advent of electronics retailers relying on aggressive marketing techniques and competitive pricing in the late 1970s. Many experienced managers departed. The company filed for bankruptcy in 1981 and most Lafayette stores in the state of New York closed by the end of the year. Approximately two thirds of company-owned stores were closed immediately. According to one employee, they were "given 48 hours to tear the entire store down, get everything boxed that had a valid and current stock number, and get it on a truck to take it back to Syosset (Lafayette’s Long Island warehouse). Anything that wasn’t on the official inventory sheets was to be discarded".

In 1981, Lafayette Radio entered Chapter 11 bankruptcy. Several Lafayette stores were purchased by Circuit City of Richmond, Virginia. Of the 150 stores that Lafayette had once owned, eight stores remained when Circuit City took over. In order to keep the Lafayette name, which was popular in New York, Circuit City changed the store names to "Lafayette-Circuit City". However, these store locations were much smaller than a standard Circuit City, and did not carry major appliances, which Circuit City carried at the time. The stores were eventually closed as Circuit City left the New York Market (only to return later). The Syosset repair center was kept open a year after the last store closing to handle warranty coverage. Lafayette-Circuit City used the phrase "no haggling" in its ad campaign, which featured celebrities such as Don King, in trying to demonstrate that the lowest price was always posted, unlike many competitors where you would have to bargain with the sales person for a lower price. This approach, however, did not work, and Lafayette-Circuit City fell due to competition from other New York area electronic retailers such as Newmark and Lewis, Trader Horn, The Wiz, Crazy Eddie, and PC Richard.

As of 2003, the Lafayette brand name was re-launched at the CES show that year. The company's products are offered only through special dealers and limited retail stores.

== Products ==
Lafayette's products ranged from individual resistors, capacitors, and components to stereos and two-way radios for amateur radio, CBers, and shortwave listeners. Many were dedicated types with special functions, such as VHF receivers for police and fire channels built into a CB radio. The company's best selling products were often shortwave receivers, parts, and portable radios. In the 1960s, many Lafayette brand radios were rebranded Trio-Kenwood sets. A significant share of 1960s and 1970s vintage Lafayette hi-fi gear was manufactured by a Japanese subcontractor named "Planet Research". "Criterion" brand speakers were built by several offshore and some domestic assemblers. Science kits were popular, and Lafayette offered the "Novatron", a "Miniature Atom Smasher" (van de Graaff generator), Model F-371.

While the catalog heavily promoted the company's own branded products, Lafayette also carried models from many other hi-fi manufacturers of the era, including Marantz, Fisher, Pioneer, Sansui, AR, Dynaco, KLH, Wharfedale, Bozak, BIC, BSR McDonald, Garrard, Dual, TEAC, Akai, Shure, Empire, Pickering, Electro-Voice, JVC, Panasonic, Sony and others. The catalogs and advertising helped promote the concept of high-fidelity sound to customers, some of whom lived many miles away from major electronics stores, during a time when only the largest urban areas had dedicated "stereo" stores. Lafayette also offered TV vacuum tube testing, for customers who wanted to service their own televisions.

Lafayette was quick to jump on industry trends, first by embracing open reel tape recorders, and later, 8-track cartridge recorders and compact cassette recorders, along with an array of gimmicks, supplies, and accessories. During the mid-1970s, the company's stores were one of few places one could actually experience four channel ("quadraphonic") sound. However the lack of a single industry standard (Columbia SQ vs. JVC's CD-4 and Sansui's QS) dampened sales, and the experiment ended in 1976.

Lafayette also sold a variety of electronic musical equipment made by different manufacturers. There were solid-body and hollow-body electric guitars, probably made by Teisco or Harmony. Microphones, amplifiers, and various electronic effects such as reverbs were available, many of which sported the Lafayette brand name, most notably the Echo Verb and Echo Verb II. Among the most famous guitar effects that Lafayette sold were the Roto-Vibe and Uni-Vibe, used by many musicians, most notably Jimi Hendrix. Robin Trower, and Stevie Ray Vaughan; others later used the effect to emulate Hendrix's sounds and achieve new ones of their own.

== Gallery ==
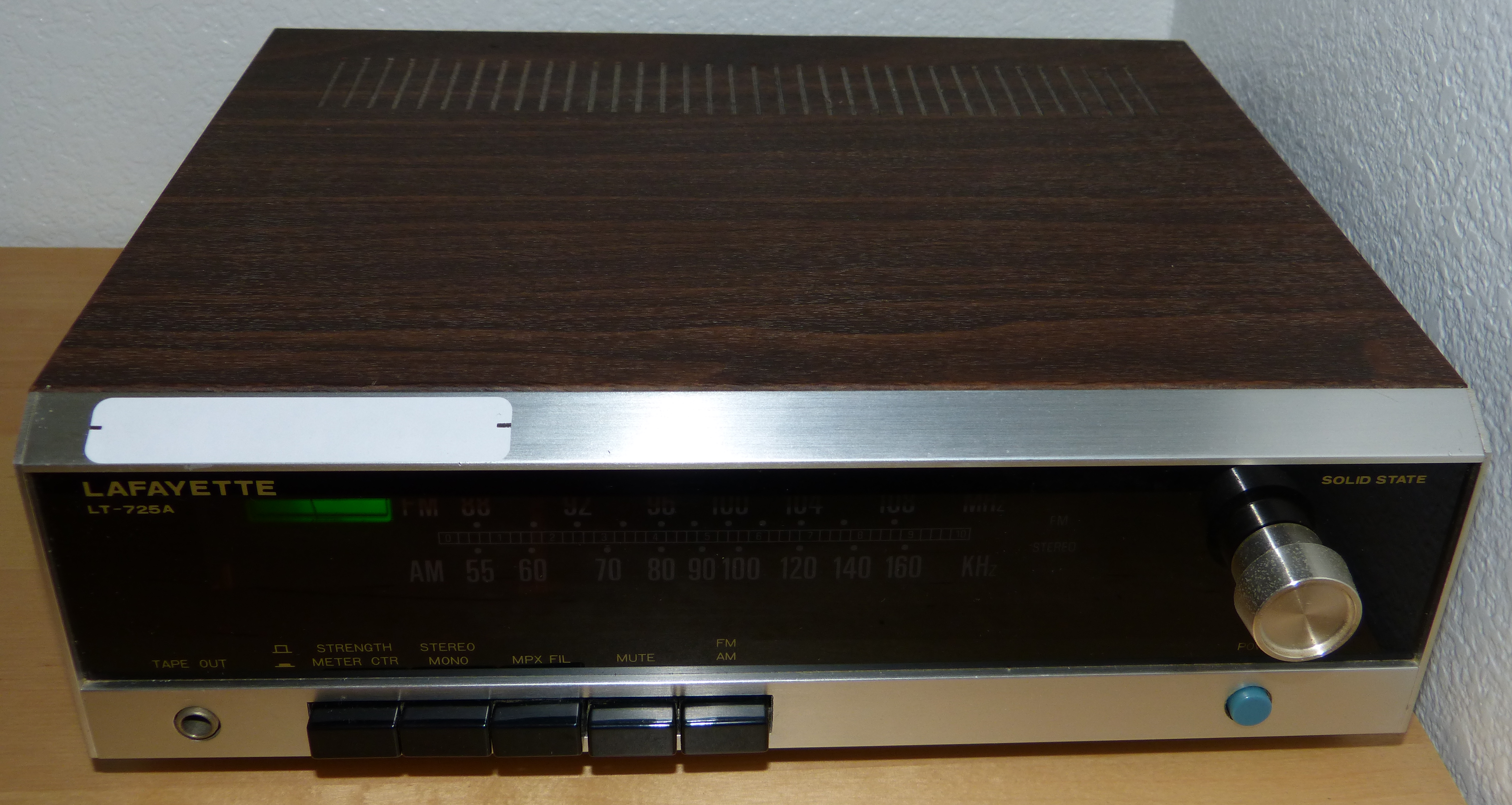
Lafayette LT-725A solid state stereo tuner

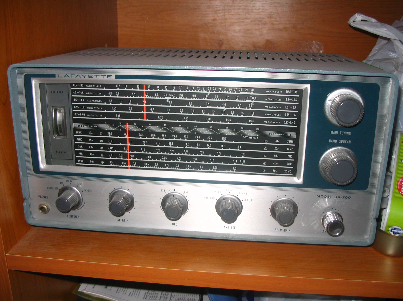
Lafayette HA-700 vacuum tube shortwave radio receiver

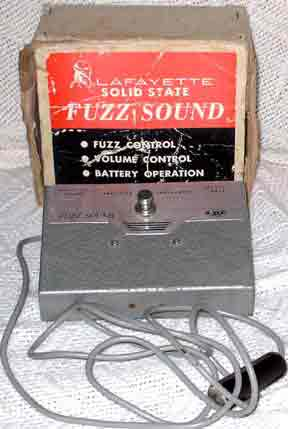
Lafayette solid state fuzz sound guitar pedal

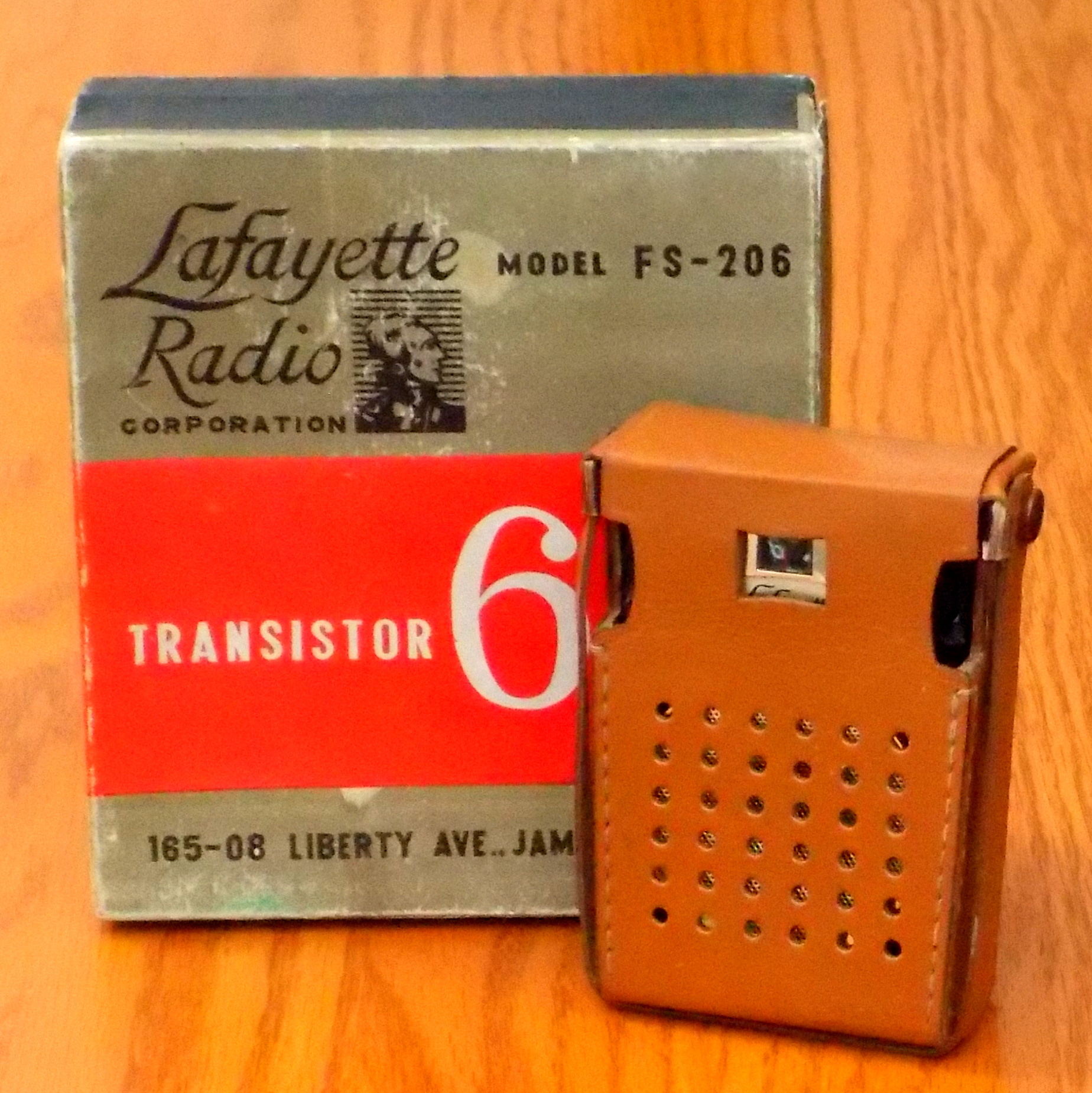
Lafayette Model FS-206 Transistor radio

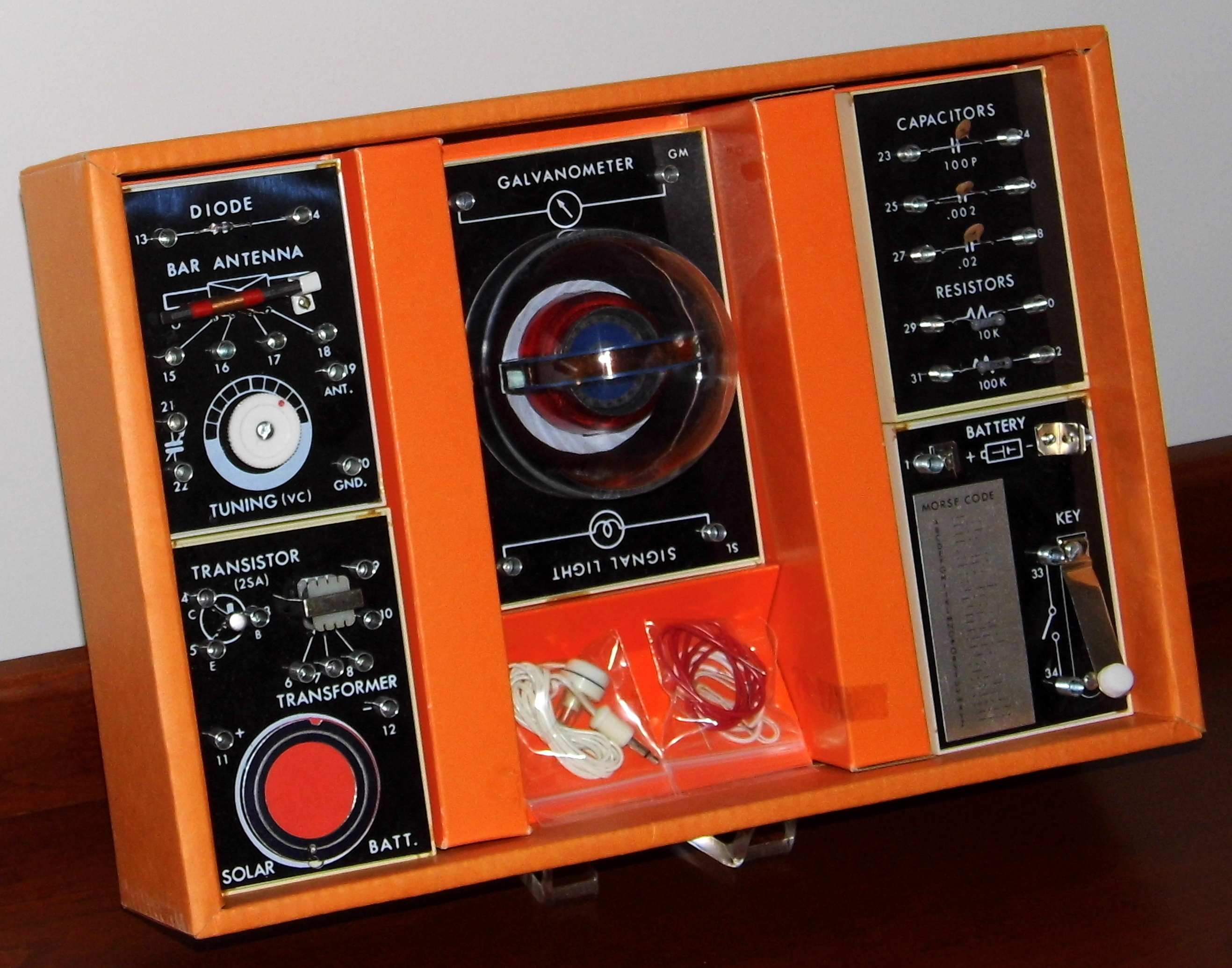
Lafayette 20-In-1 Electronic Project Kit

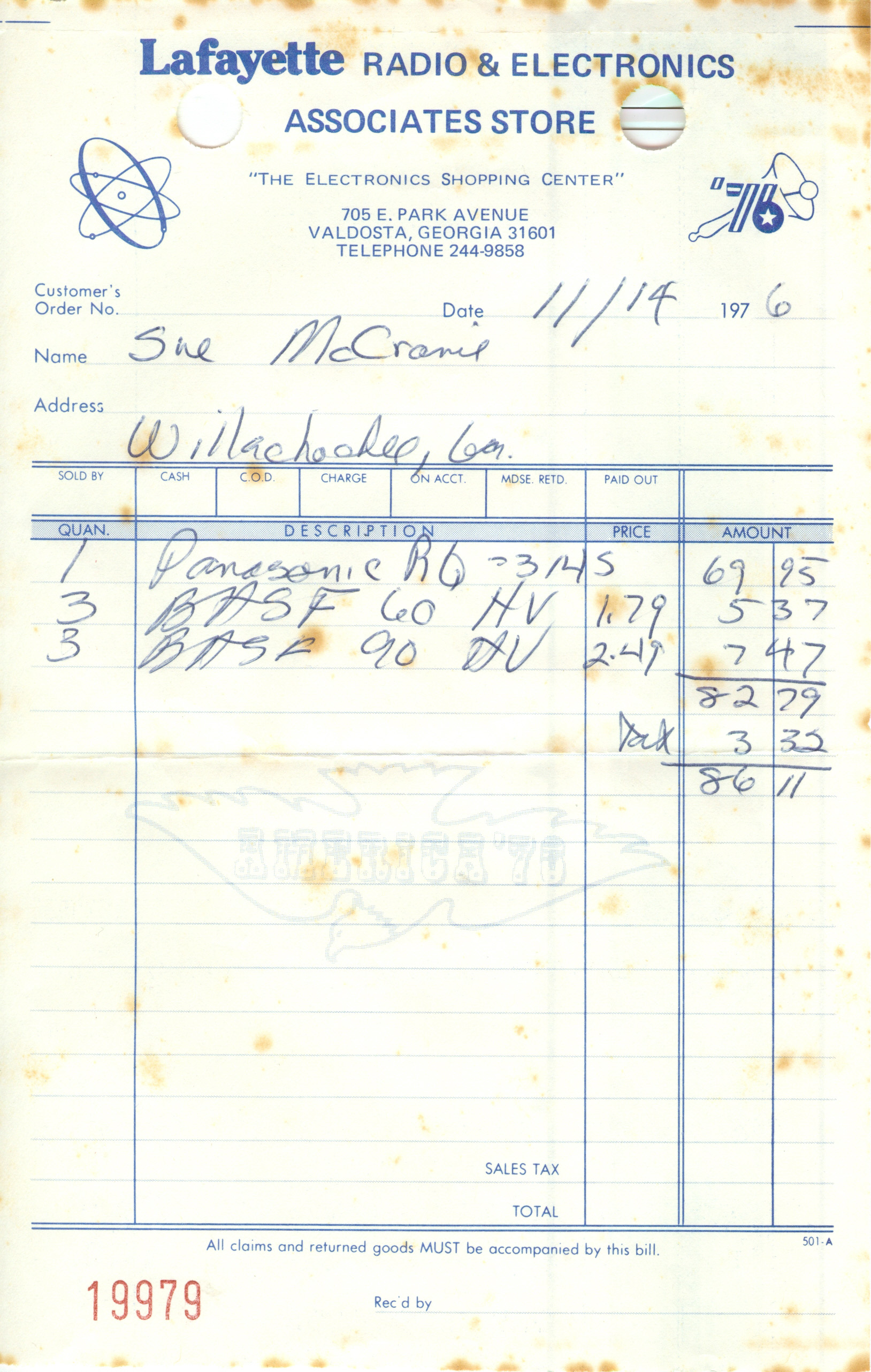
Bicentennial sales slip

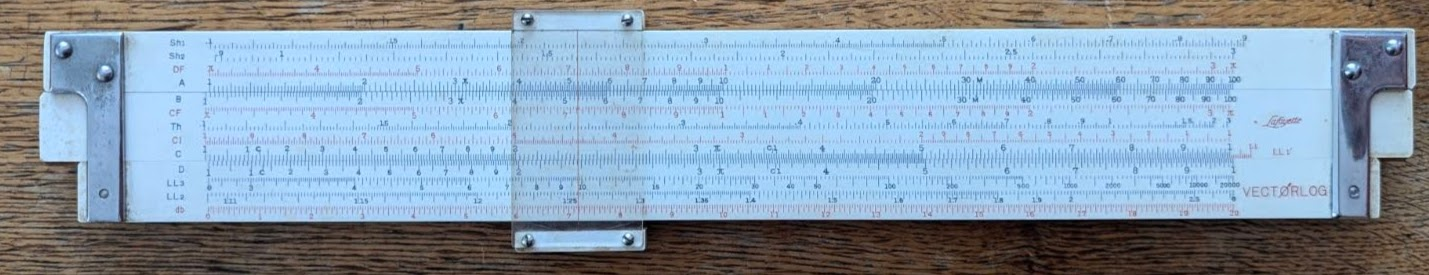
Lafayette VECTØRLOG slide rule (1962), model F-686, 12", made in Japan

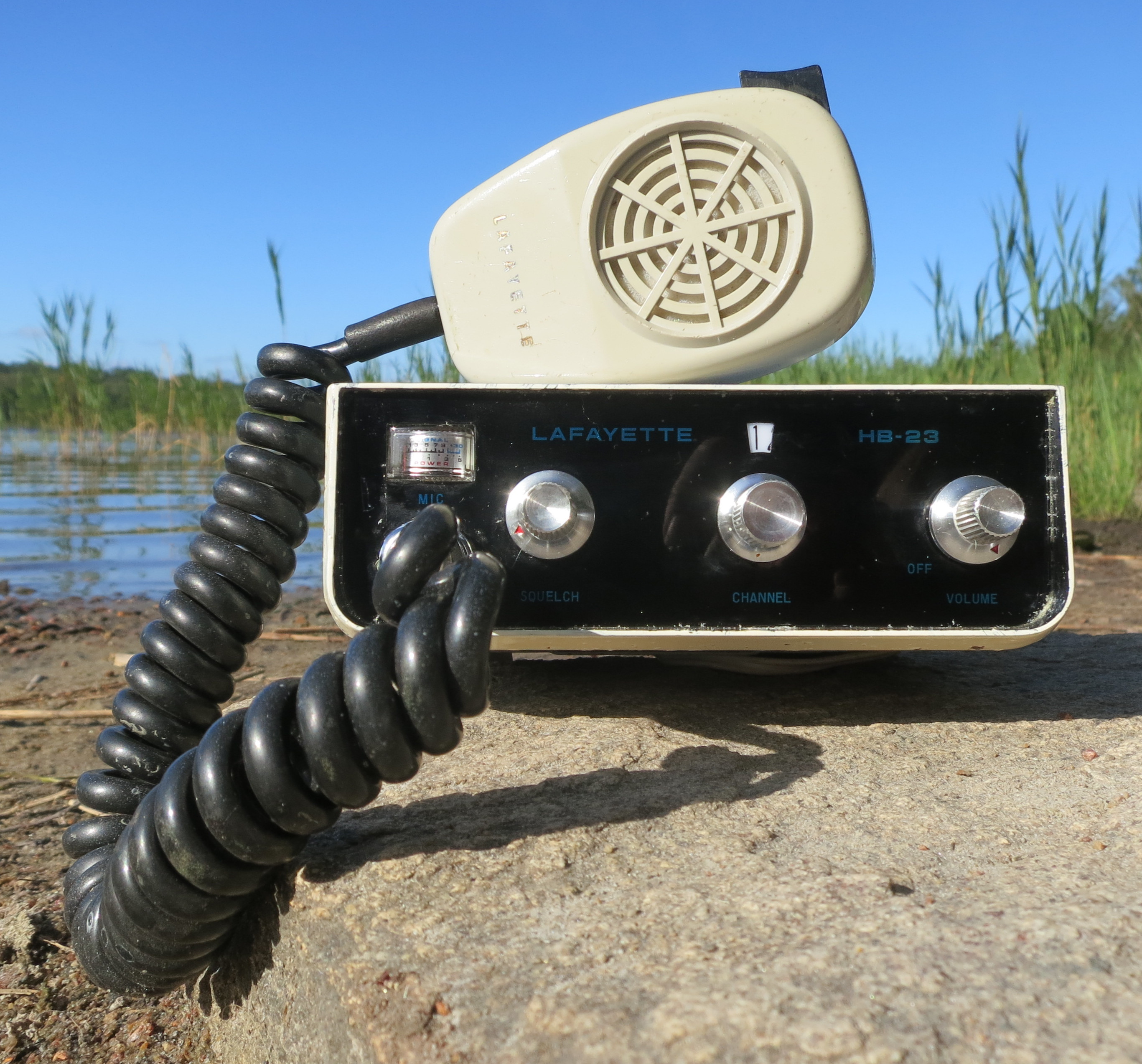
Lafayette HB-23 citizen band transceiver (1968-1971)

== See also ==
- Media related to Lafayette Radio Electronics Corporation at Wikimedia Commons
- Allied Electronics
- Heathkit
- Radio Shack
