= Gordon Letwin =

American software developer and early Microsoft employee

James Gordon Letwin (born July 2, 1952) is an American software developer and one of the eleven early Microsoft employees who posed for an iconic staff portrait taken in Albuquerque in 1978.

He worked for Heathkit as the company's first software developer, working on HDOS and Benton Harbor BASIC for the Heathkit H8, and porting Colossal Cave Adventure to the computer. before joining Microsoft.

Letwin's first project at Microsoft was writing a BASIC compiler. He is most noted for being the lead architect of the OS/2 operating system on the Microsoft side, with Ed Iacobucci being the lead architect from IBM's side. Letwin contributed much of the design and code for several core components, including the HPFS file system.

Letwin gained a reputation for technical expertise. A 1982 article stated that "when J. Gordon Letwin talks about operating systems, people listen", and quoted another as saying that he "is clearly thinking three or four years ahead of the state of the art". Letwin left Microsoft in 1993 to "kick back" with his wife. While at Microsoft he had become a millionaire, with a 2000 Time article estimating his worth at around $20 million. Since leaving Microsoft, Letwin has donated substantial amounts of money to environmental causes via the Wilburforce Foundation, a charitable foundation created by him and his wife, Rose.

== See also ==
- History of Microsoft
- Microsoft Adventure

== Bibliography ==
- Letwin, Gordon (1988). Inside OS/2. Microsoft Press. ISBN 1-55615-117-9.
