= Zenith Z-89 =

Personal computer produced by Zenith Data Systems

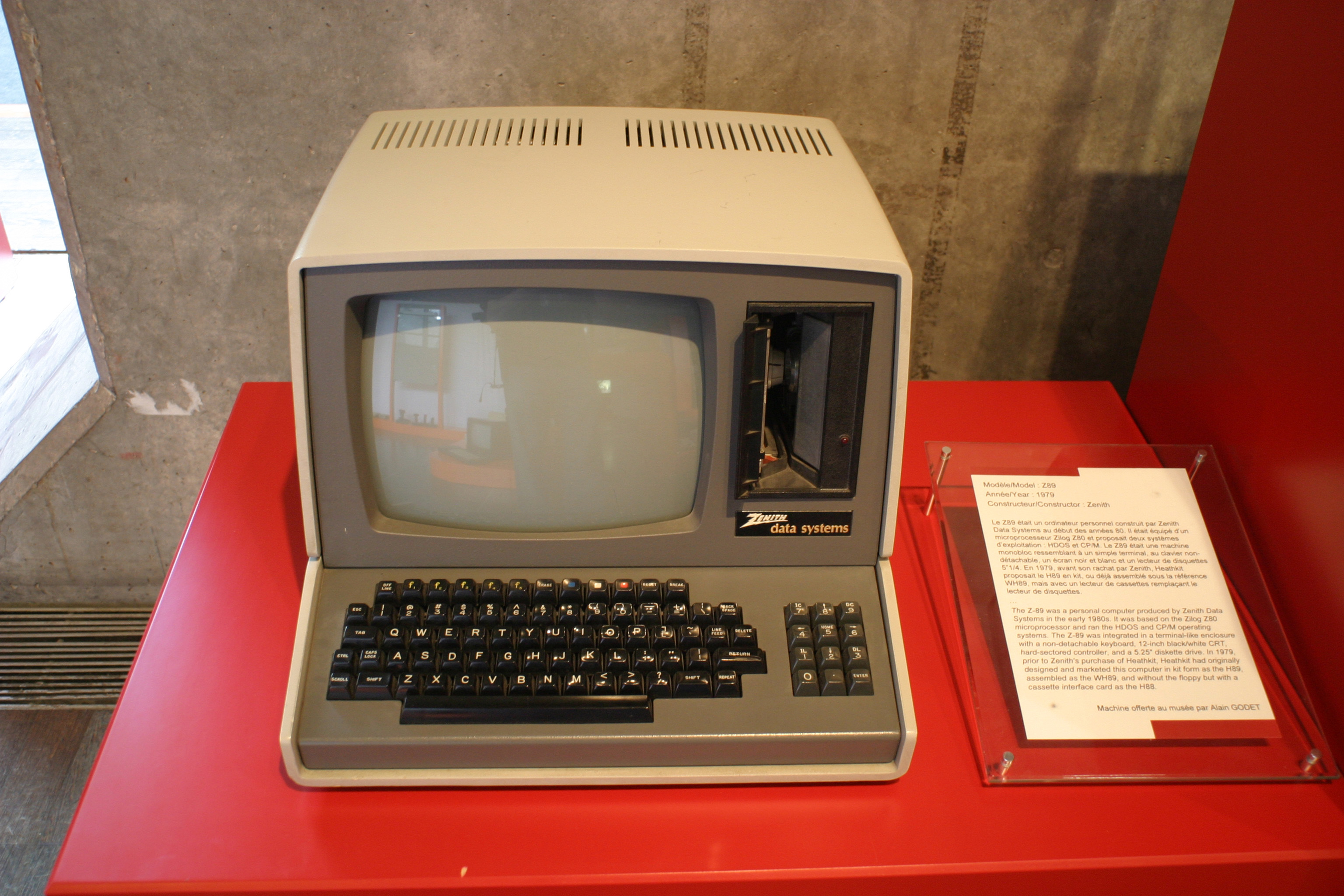
- Zenith Z-89 in Paris 2008
- Also known as: Heathkit H89
- Manufacturer: Zenith Data Systems (ZDS)
- Type: Personal computer
- Released: 1979; 47 years ago
- Introductory price: Kit version with 1 floppy drive: US$1800 in 1979 (circa equivalent to $7,800 in 2024)
- Discontinued: 1985
- Operating system: ROM monitor, HDOS, CP/M, UCSD Pascal (P-System Pascal), or MP/M
- CPU: 2x 2.048 MHz Zilog Z80 (one for the terminal)
- Memory: RAM: 16 KB – 48 KB on main board, optional 16 KB memory card (max addressable: CP/M - 64 KB, HDOS - 56 KB)
- Display: 12" monochrome CRT, 80 x 25 character text
- Sound: Beeper
- Connectivity: 3 serial, 1 Centronics parallel (optional), external diskette drive connector
- Related: Heathkit H88

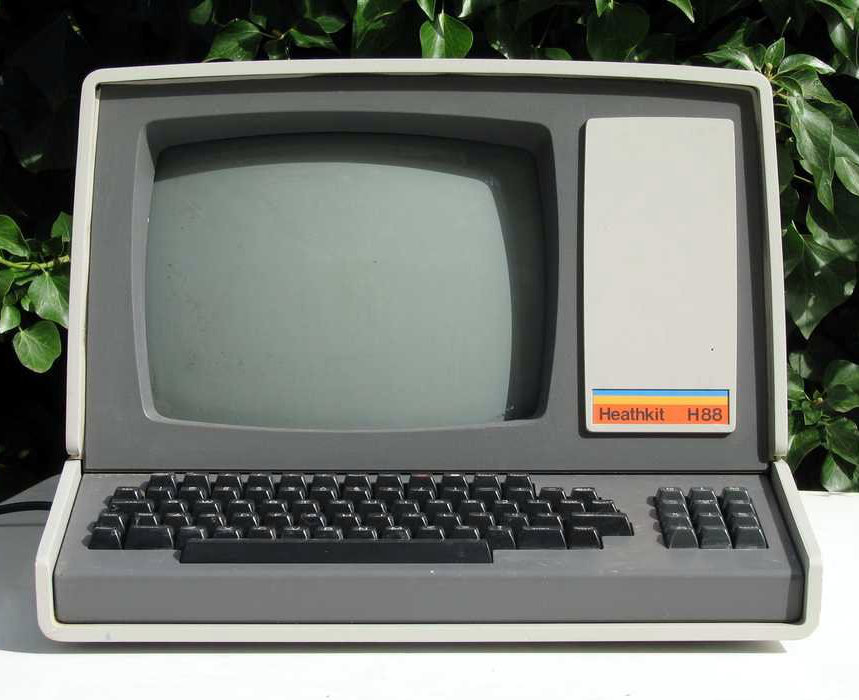
Heathkit H88 computer

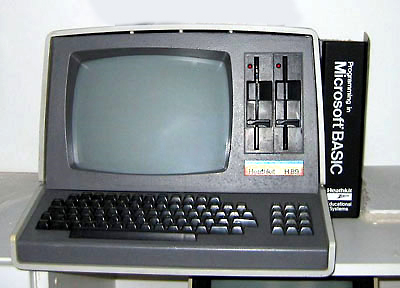
Heathkit H89 aka Zenith Z-89. This unit has two half-height DD diskette drives in place of the single full-height original.

The Z-89 is a personal computer introduced in 1979 by Heathkit, but produced primarily by Zenith Data Systems (ZDS) in the early 1980s. It combined an updated version of the Heathkit H8 microcomputer and H19 terminal in a new case that has room for a built-in floppy disk on the right side of the display. Based on the Zilog Z80 microprocessor, it is capable of running CP/M as well as Heathkit's own HDOS.

== Description ==
The Zenith Z-89 is based on the Zilog Z80 microprocessor running at 2.048 MHz, and supports the HDOS and CP/M operating systems. The US$2295 Z-89 is integrated in a terminal-like enclosure with a non-detachable keyboard, 12-inch monochrome CRT displaying 80x25 characters, 48 KB RAM, and a 5.25" floppy disk drive (originally hard-sectored with 100 KB storage capacity). The CRT was available in white or green phosphor versions.

The computer is compatible with Heathkit H8 software and shipped with Benton Harbor BASIC. Compatible operating systems are HDOS, CP/M (requiring a hardware modification by Heath/Zenith to the ROM monitor), UCSD Pascal (P-System Pascal), and MP/M.

The keyboard keys were high quality compared to other machines at that time. The keyboard has 19 programmable keys, including several special purpose keys: REPEAT, ESC, Tab ↹, CAPS, CTRL, SCROLL, RESET, BREAK, BACK SPACE, LINE FEED, DELETE, and three with white, red, and blue squares. There are five function keys and a numeric keypad.

The computer has two small card cages inside the cabinet on either side of the CRT, each of which accept up to three Benton Harbor Bus-compatible expansion cards. Upgrade cards available for this included disk controller cards (see below), a 16 KB RAM card that upgrades the standard 48 KB RAM to 64 KB, a RAM memory card accessible as a ramdrive using a special driver (above the Z80's 64 KB memory limit) and a multi-serial card providing extra RS-232 ports. The 2 MHz Z80 can be upgraded to 4 MHz.

The computer supports the Kansas City standard for tape storage. In 1979, prior to Zenith's purchase of Heath Company, Heathkit designed and marketed this computer in kit form as the Heath H89, assembled as the WH89, and without the floppy but with a cassette interface card as the H88. (Prior to the Zenith purchase, the Heathkit model numbers did not include the dash).

Heath/Zenith also made a serial terminal, the H19/Z-19, based on the same enclosure (with a blank cover over the diskette drive cut-out) and terminal controller. The company offered an upgrade kit to convert the terminal into a full H89/Z-89 computer. These systems were among the first available that supported ANSI escape sequences (sequences similar to the VT52 were also supported). Graphics was limited to 33 block/box drawing characters along with reverse video. The 25th line did not scroll with the others.

Another configuration, the Z-90, changes the floppy drive controller from the hard-sectored controller (max 100 kB) to a soft-sectored controller that supports double-sided, double density, 96 tpi drives with a capacity of 640 kB. It also came standard with 64 KB of RAM.

There were several external drive systems available for the H89/Z-89.

- The H77/Z-77 and H87/Z-87 supports up to two additional Single-Sided, Single Density, 48 tpi 5.25" drives. When connected to the standard hard-sectored controller, it stores 100 kB per floppy. By connecting it to a soft-sectored controller, it stores 160 kB per floppy.
- The H37/Z-37 supports up to two Double-Sided, Double Density, 96 tpi 5.25" drives and requires the soft-sectored controller. Each drive has a capacity of 640 kB.
- The Z-47 supports two 8" floppy drives and requires its own interface card. It uses standard IBM 3740 floppy disks with has a capacity of 1.2 MB each.
- The Z-67 is a 10 MB Winchester Drive plus one 8" floppy drive and also requires its own interface card.
- In France, the Heath/Zenith Data System branch connected the 10 MB removable cartridge hard disk, manufactured by Bull in Belfort

A maximum of two disk controller cards can be installed in a standard system.

== Reception ==
Creative Computing in 1980 described the Heath H89 as "the most professional looking" microcomputer available. Stating that it was "one of the finest" available for less than $3000, the magazine predicted that it "can have a major impact on the small computer market" if good software became available for it. BYTE wrote that the H89 "has a number of unique hardware features and the same excellent software support and documentation as the original H-8 system", although recommending a second floppy drive when used with HDOS.

A writer for Kilobaud Microcomputing reported in 1981 that, with soldering experience, assembling H89 required about 20 hours. He concluded "This is a powerful computer, with a lot of software backing it up ... I'm pleased, and I think you would be too". Despite finding bugs in how the terminal interacted with Supercalc, Jerry Pournelle praised the Zenith Z-19 in 1982 as "an excellent terminal in many ways—I recommend it as about as good as you can get just now".

Zenith acknowledged that selling kit computers not designed to be shipped preassembled sometimes caused problems. The Z-89's successor, the Zenith Z-100, was designed as a preassembled product.

== Software ==
There are 20 games released compatible with, the Zenith computer, including Heathkit H8 games.

Name	Year	Publisher
B-1 Nuclear Bomber	1984	Microcell Computer Systems
Blackjack	1977	Heathkit
Casino Games	1978	Multi-Micro Media Corp.
Computer Baseball Strategy	1984	Microcomputer Games
Computer Stocks and Bonds	1984	Intelligence Quest Soft.
Game Set = 1	1977	Heathkit
Game Set = 2	1978	Heathkit
H8-BG1	1978	Multi-Micro Media Corp.
H8-BG2	1978	Multi-Micro Media Corp.
Interactive Fiction: Dragons of Hong Kong	1981	Evryware
Invaders	1981	Software Toolworks, The
Kingdom	1978	Multi-Micro Media Corp.
Manipulation Games	1978	Multi-Micro Media Corp.
Munchkin	1981	Software Toolworks, The
Mychess	1980	Software Toolworks, The
Number Games	1978	Multi-Micro Media Corp.
Space Pirates	1981	Software Toolworks, The
Startrek	1977	Heathkit
Telengard Model	1984	Microcomputer Games
The Adventure	1982	Software Toolworks, The
