= Microsoft Adventure =

1979 video game

- TRS-80/Apple II cover
- Developer: Softwin Associates
- Publishers: Microsoft (TRS, Apple); IBM (IBM PC)
- Programmer: Gordon Letwin
- Platforms: Apple II, IBM PC, TRS-80
- Release: 1979: TRS-80, Apple II; 1981: IBM PC
- Genre: Interactive fiction
- Mode: Single-player

Microsoft Adventure is an interactive fiction game published in 1979 by Microsoft for the TRS-80 and Apple II, then released in 1981 by IBM for the IBM PC. It is based on the PDP-10 mainframe game Colossal Cave Adventure. It was programmed for Microsoft by Gordon Letwin of Softwin Associates.

== Gameplay ==
Microsoft Adventure is a text game in which the player explores caves and acquires treasure, using one- or two-word commands to move or manipulate objects, and the game awards points for successfully exploring areas and gathering treasure. There are 130 rooms containing 15 treasures, 40 useful objects, and 12 problems for the player to solve. The progress of two separate games can be saved on a diskette. The game includes most of the content from Colossal Cave Adventure, along with a few locations unique to this version.

== Release ==
Microsoft originally released Microsoft Adventure in 1979 for the TRS-80 and the Apple II under its new division, Microsoft Consumer Products. IBM later included Microsoft Adventure as the only game in the initial software releases for the IBM Personal Computer, making it one of the first two games available for the new computer along with DONKEY.BAS (included with the operating system). It was released on a single-sided 5 1/4 inch self-booting disk.

== Reception ==
Carrington Dixon reviewed Microsoft Adventure in The Space Gamer No. 49. Dixon commented that "No game that exists on several different computers can fully demonstrate the potential of any one computer. Even so, your [money] buys many hours of cave exploring and treasure snatching. There is only one 'setup' but that one is rich and complex enough to keep anyone busy for many games. I suspect that many people will come back to this one after some flashier games have been permanently set aside." PC Magazine also reviewed the game positively, writing, "This hoary old classic should be included in any player's collection of games for the IBM PC."
