= Zenith Z-100 =

Personal computer made by Zenith Data Systems (1982)

- Manufacturer: Zenith Data Systems
- Type: personal computer
- Released: June 1982; 43 years ago
- Operating system: Available with CP/M-80, CP/M-86 and Z-DOS (non-IBM compatible MS-DOS variant)
- CPU: Dual processors: 8085 and 8088
- Memory: Base 128 KB RAM, expandable to 192 KB on board, to 768 KB with S-100 cards. (Video RAM was paged into the 64 KB block above 768 KB).
- Storage: Two 320 KB 40-track double-sided 5.25-inch Floppy disk drives. Socket enabled direct plug-in of external 8-inch floppies.
- Display: 25 lines × 80 characters
- Graphics: 640×225 bitmap display. 8-color (low-profile model), or monochrome upgradable to 8-level greyscale (all-in-one).
- Input: 2× serial ports (2661 UART), one Centronics printer port (discrete TTL chips), light pen port
- Power: 300 watts

The Z-100 computer is a personal computer made by Zenith Data Systems (ZDS). It was a competitor to the IBM PC.

== Design ==
The Zenith Data Systems Z-100 is a pre-assembled version of the Heathkit H100 electronic kit, but unlike the Zenith Z-89 that Heathkit created, the Z-100 was designed first as a preassembled product. Design began in March 1981 for a Z-89 successor with faster processor, improved graphics, support for memory beyond 64K, and more sophisticated operating systems.

In the same family, the Z-120 is an all-in-one model with self-contained monitor, and the Z-110 (called the low profile model) is similar in size to the cabinet of an IBM PC.Both models have a built-in keyboard that was modeled after the IBM Selectric typewriter.

- Dual processors: 8085 and 8088.
- Available with CP/M and Z-DOS (non-IBM compatible MS-DOS variant).
- Five S-100 expansion slots.
- Two 320 KB 40-track double-sided 5.25-inch floppy disk drives. Socket enabled direct plug-in of external 8-inch floppies.
- Two serial ports (2661 UART), one Centronics printer port (discrete TTL chips), light pen port.
- 640×225 bitmap display, with eight colors (low-profile model), or monochrome upgradable to eight greyscales (all-in-one).
- Base 128 KB RAM, expandable to 192 KB on board, to 768 KB with S-100 cards. (Video RAM was paged into the 64 KB block above 768 KB).

Zenith stated that the Z-100 would be compatible with most Intel 8080 and Z-89 software. The computer is partially compatible with the IBM PC, using standard floppy drives. It runs a non-IBM version of MS-DOS, so generic MS-DOS programs run, but most commercial PC software uses IBM BIOS extensions and do not run, including Lotus 1-2-3. Several companies offered software or hardware solutions to permit unmodified PC programs to work on the Z-100.

The Z-100 has unusually good graphics for its era, superior to the contemporary CGA (640×200 monochrome bitmap or 320×200 four-color), IBM Monochrome Display Adapter (MDA) (80×25 monochrome text-only), and with eight colors or grayscales available at a lower resolution than the Hercules Graphics Card (720×348 monochrome). Early versions of AutoCAD were released for the Z-100 because of these advanced graphics.

Aftermarket vendors also released modifications to upgrade mainboard memory and permit installation of an Intel 8087 math coprocessor.

== Uses ==
In 1983, Clarkson College of Technology became the first college in the nation to give each incoming freshman a personal computer. The model issued to them was the Z-100. Each student paid $1800 for the computer during their time at Clarkson.

InfoWorld in 1986 described the Z-120 as "the Air Force's workhorse microcomputer".

== Reception ==
Jerry Pournelle in 1983 praised the Z-100's keyboard, and wrote that it "had the best color graphics I've seen on a small machine". Although forced to buy a real IBM PC because of the Z-100 and other computers' incomplete PC compatibility, he reported in December 1983 that a friend who was inexperienced with electronic kits was able to assemble a Z-100 in a day, with only the disk controller needing soldering. Ken Skier praised the computer's reliability in the magazine in January 1984 after using the computer for more than 40 hours a week for eight months. While criticizing its inability to read other disk formats, he approved of Zenith's technical support, documentation, and keyboard and graphics. Skier concluded that those who "want a well-designed, well-built, well-documented system that runs the best of 8-bit and 16-bit worlds" should "consider the Zenith Z-100". "Simply put", InfoWorld wrote, "this is an excellent machine". Graphics, keyboard, adherence to industry standards, 90-day on-site service ("something you'd expect if you dropped $1 million on a mainframe"), and bundled software were among the features the magazine approved of. While wishing for tutorial documentation, detachable keyboard, and quieter fan, InfoWorld concluded "This is a superb machine".
