= Heathkit =

Brand of electronic kits

Heath Company
- Industry: Aviation, electronics
- Founded: 1911; 115 years ago in Saint Joseph, Michigan, United States
- Headquarters: Fargo, North Dakota; formerly Benton Harbor, Michigan, United States
- Key people: Will Cromarty, CEO
- Website: shop.heathkit.com

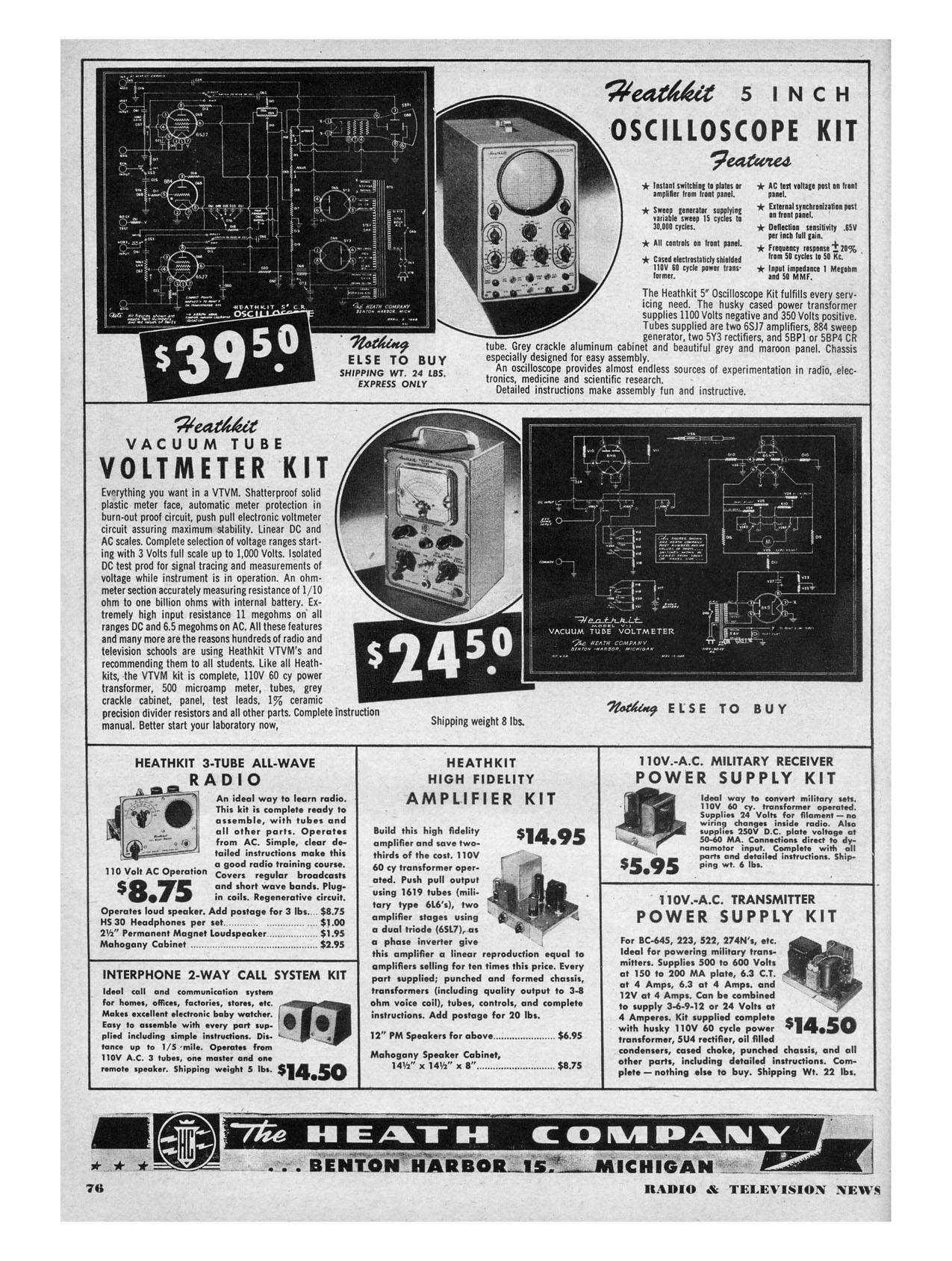
1947 Heathkit ad featuring the 5-inch oscilloscope.

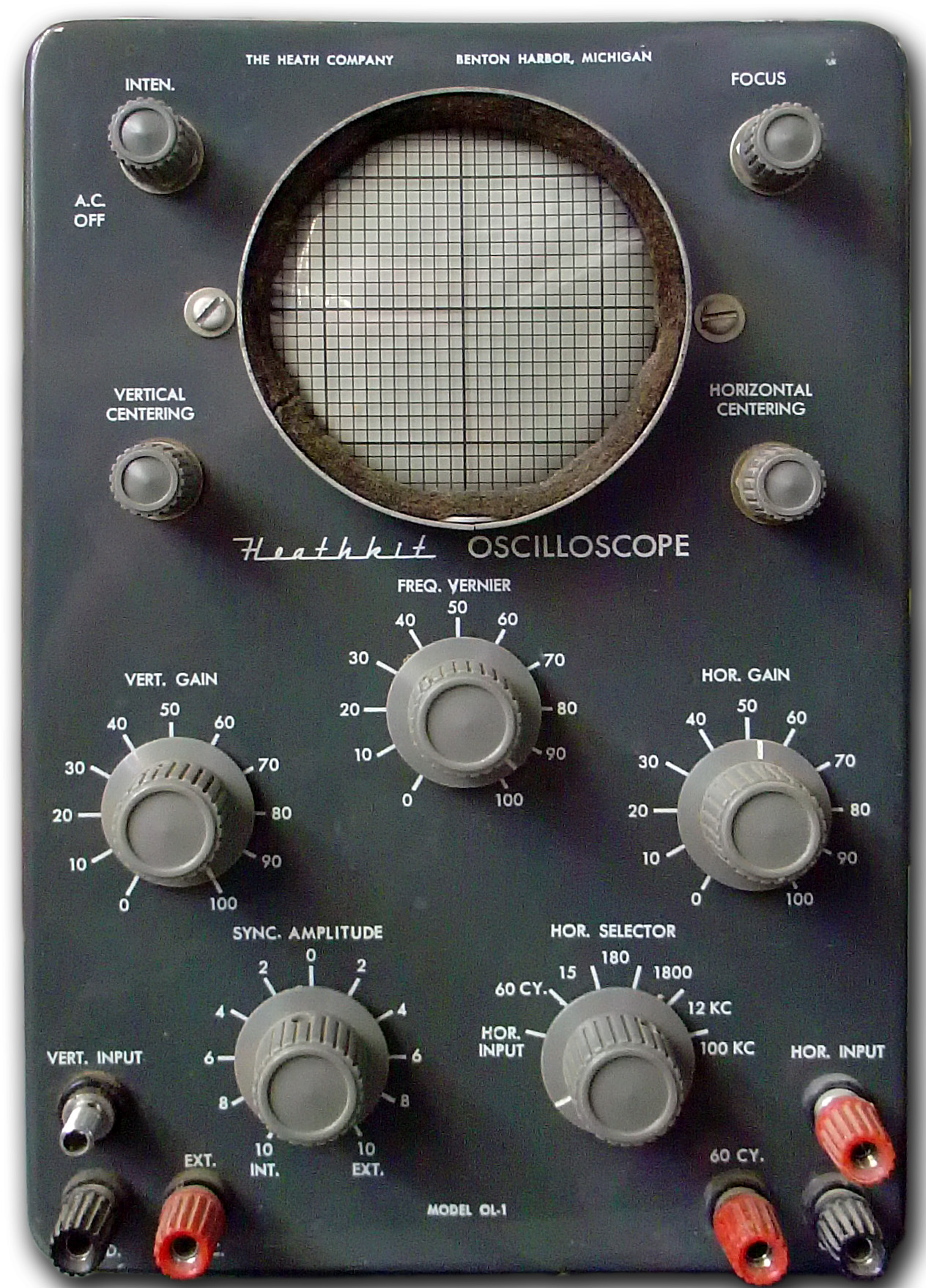
An oscilloscope OL-1 from 1954, the company's first with a relatively small 3-inch CRT which allowed for a highly competitive price of US$ 29.50 (equivalent to $354 in 2025) for the DIY kit.

Heathkit is the brand name of kits and other electronic products produced and marketed by the Heath Company. The products over the decades have included electronic test equipment, high fidelity home audio equipment, television receivers, amateur radio equipment, robots, electronic ignition conversion modules for early model cars with point style ignitions, and the influential Heath H-8, H-89, and H-11 hobbyist computers, which were sold in kit form for assembly by the purchaser.

Heathkit manufactured electronic kits from 1947 until 1992. After closing that business, the Heath Company continued with its products for education, and motion-sensor lighting controls. The lighting control business was sold around 2000. The company announced in 2011 that they were reentering the kit business after a 20-year hiatus but then filed for bankruptcy in 2012, and under new ownership began restructuring in 2013.

As of 2022, the company has a live website with newly designed products, services, vintage kits, and replacement parts for sale. In August 2023 Heath Company announced its acquisition by Kirkwall (company) as part of a planned expansion in North Dakota, and named former CIA officer and entrepreneur Will Cromarty as President and Chief Executive Officer.

== Founding ==
The Heath Company was founded as an aircraft company in 1911 by Edward Bayard Heath with the purchase of Bates Aeroplane Co, soon renamed to E.B. Heath Aerial Vehicle Co. Starting in 1926 it sold a light aircraft, the Heath Parasol, in kit form. Heath died during a 1931 test flight. His company went bankrupt, reorganized, and moved from Chicago to Niles, Michigan.

In 1935, Howard Anthony purchased the bankrupt Heath Aircraft Company's name, and focused on selling accessories for small aircraft. He had little success until World War II brought a military contract to make aircraft parts. The company grew from five to 125 employees. After the war contracts were canceled and Heath shrank back to five employees.

Anthony decided that entering the electronics industry was a good idea, and bought a large stock of surplus wartime electronic parts with the intention of building kits with them. In 1947, Heath introduced its first electronic kit, the O1 oscilloscope with 5-inch diameter cathode-ray tube (CRT) display that sold for US$39.50 (equivalent to $570 in 2025). With the low price, the O1 became very successful.

500 flyers offering the kit for $39.95 resulted in 350 orders, giving Anthony the funds necessary to hire employees to produce the product. By 1954 Heath had $10 million in annual revenue and Anthony successfully invested in natural gas. In 1954, Anthony was the second head of Heath to die in a plane crash.

== Heathkit product concept ==
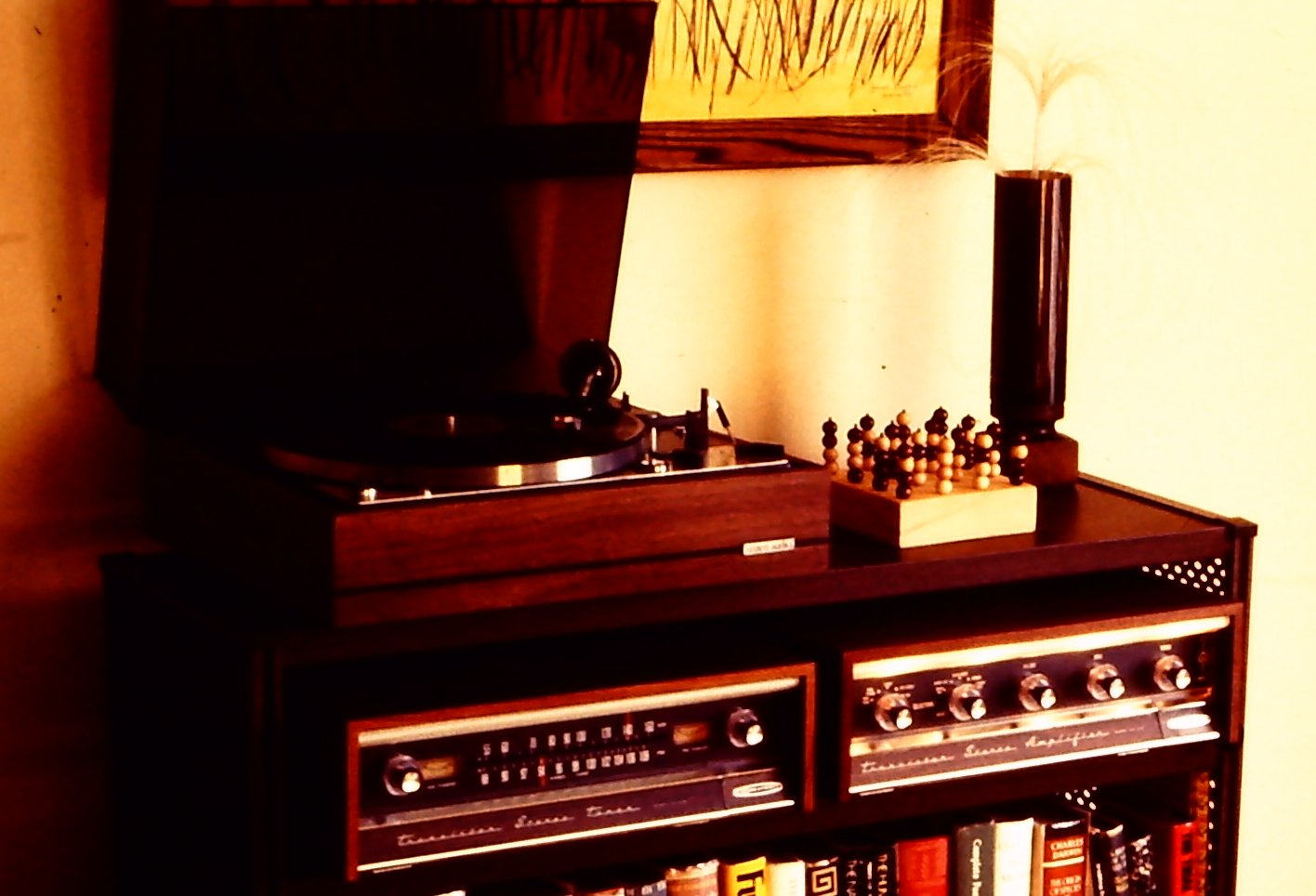
A Heathkit stereo tuner (AJ-43D) and amplifier (AA-21D) (1972)

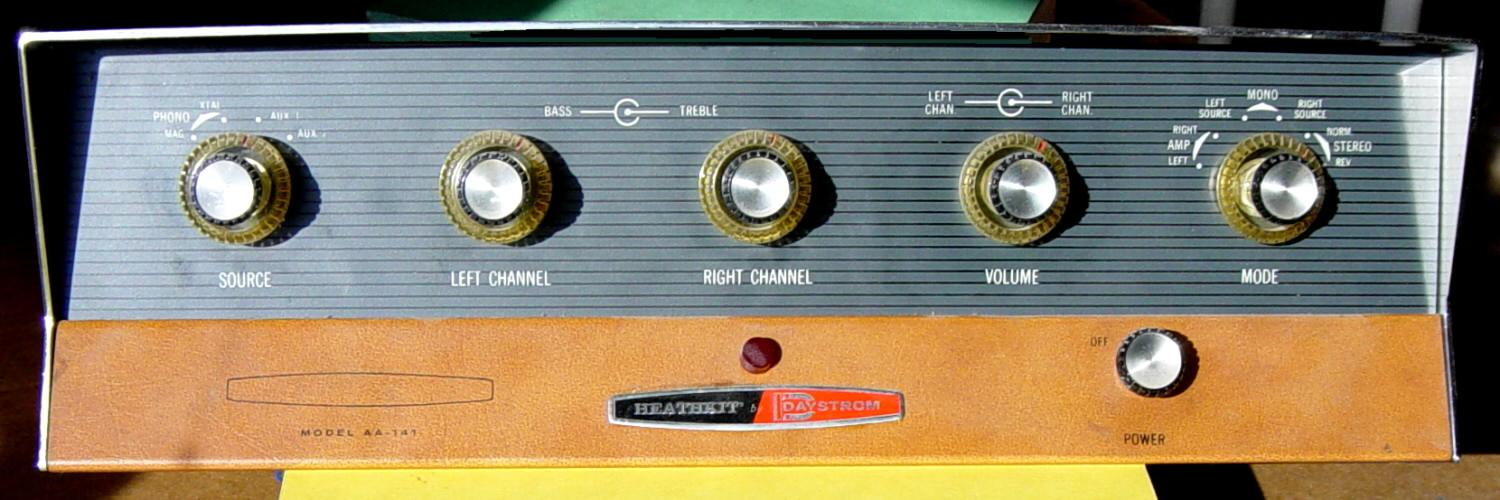
A Heathkit stereo preamplifier (AA-141) (1962)

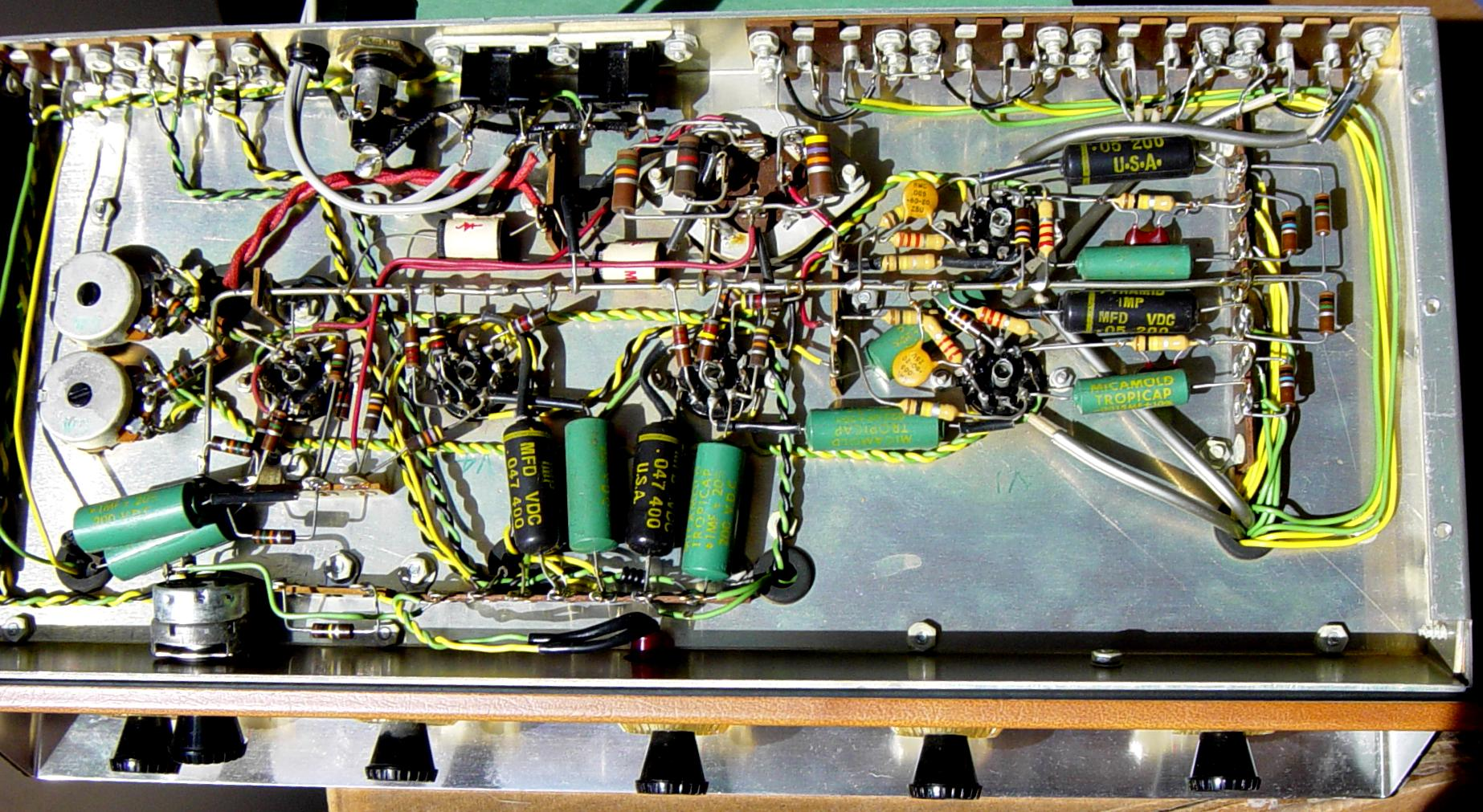
A point-to-point construction of a Heathkit stereo preamplifier (AA-141) (1962)

After the success of the oscilloscope kit, Heath went on to produce dozens of Heathkit products. Heathkits were influential in shaping two generations of electronic hobbyists. The Heathkit sales premise was that by investing the time to assemble a Heathkit, the purchasers could build something comparable to a factory-built product at a significantly lower cash cost and, if it malfunctioned, could repair it themselves. During those decades, the premise was basically valid.

Commercial factory-built electronic products were constructed from generic, discrete components such as vacuum tubes, tube sockets, capacitors, inductors, and resistors, mostly hand-wired and assembled using point-to-point construction technology. The home kit-builder could perform these labor-intensive assembly tasks himself, and if careful, attain at least the same standard of quality. In the case of Heathkit's most expensive product at the time, the Thomas electronic organ, building the kit version represented substantial savings.

One category in which Heathkit enjoyed great popularity was amateur radio. Ham radio operators had frequently been forced to build their equipment from scratch before the advent of kits, with the difficulty of procuring all the parts separately and relying on often-experimental designs. Kits brought the convenience of all parts being supplied together, with the assurance of a predictable finished product; many Heathkit model numbers became well known in the ham radio community. The HW-101 HF transceiver became so ubiquitous that even today the "Hot Water One-Oh-One" can be found in use, or purchased as used equipment at hamfests, decades after it went out of production.

In the case of electronic test equipment, Heathkits often filled a low-end entry-level niche, giving hobbyists access at an affordable price.

The instruction books were regarded as among the best in the kit industry, being models of clarity, beginning with basic lessons on soldering technique, and proceeding with explicit step-by-step directions, illustrated with numerous line drawings; the drawings could be folded out to be visible next to the relevant text (which might be bound several pages away) and were aligned with the assembler's viewpoint. Also in view was a checkbox to mark with a pencil as each task was accomplished. The instructions usually included complete schematic diagrams, block diagrams depicting different subsystems and their interconnections, and a "Theory of Operation" section that explained the basic function of each section of the electronics.

== Heathkits as education ==
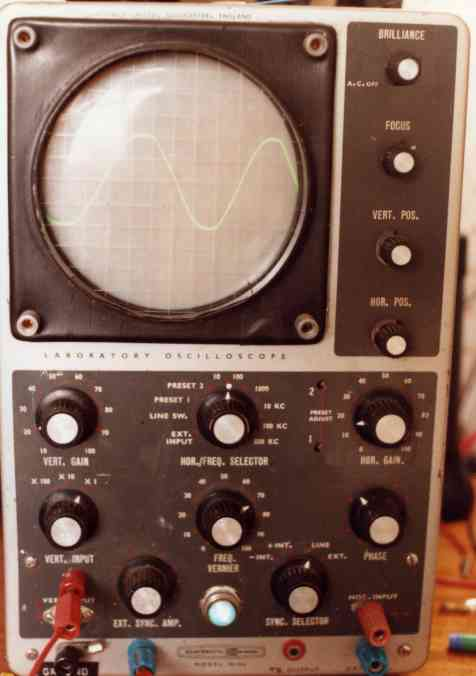
A Heathkit IO12U oscilloscope built in 1967

No knowledge of electronics was needed to assemble a Heathkit. The assembly process itself did not teach much about electronics, but provided a great deal of what could have been called basic "electronics literacy", such as the ability to identify tube pin numbers or to read a resistor color code. Many hobbyists began by assembling Heathkits, became familiar with the appearance of components like capacitors, transformers, resistors, and tubes, and were motivated to understand just what these components actually did.

For those builders who had a deeper knowledge of electronics, or for those who wanted to be able to troubleshoot/repair the product in the future, the assembly manuals usually included a detailed "Theory of Operation" chapter, which explained the functioning of the kit's circuitry, section by section.

Heath developed a business relationship with electronics correspondence schools (e.g., NRI and Bell & Howell), and supplied electronic kits to be assembled as part of their courses, with the schools basing their texts and lessons around the kits. In the 1960s, Heathkit marketed a line of its electronic instruments which had been modified for use in teaching physics at the high school (Physical Science Study Committee, PSSC) and college levels (Berkeley Physics Course).

Heathkits could teach deeper lessons. "The kits taught Steve Jobs that products were manifestations of human ingenuity, not magical objects dropped from the sky", writes a business author, who goes on to quote Jobs as saying "It gave a tremendous level of self-confidence, that through exploration and learning one could understand seemingly very complex things in one's environment."

== Diversification ==
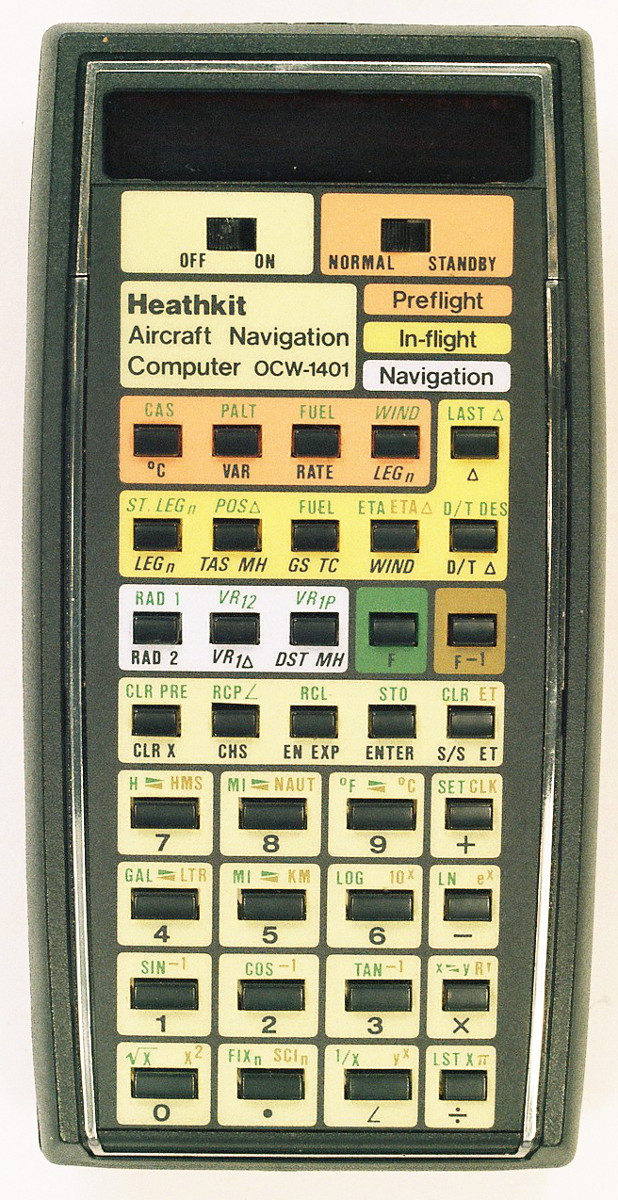
The Heathkit Aircraft Navigation Computer OC-1401/OCW-1401, 1978

After Anthony's death, his widow sold the company to Daystrom Company, a management holding company that also owned several other electronics companies. Daystrom was absorbed by oilfield service company Schlumberger Limited in 1962, and the Daystrom/Schlumberger days were to be among Heathkit's most successful despite being Schlumberger's only consumer business.

Those years saw some "firsts" in the general consumer market. The early 1960s saw the introduction of the AA-100 integrated amplifier. The early 1970s saw Heath introduce the AJ-1510, an FM tuner using digital synthesis, the GC-1005 digital clock, and the GR-2000 color television set. In 1974, Heathkit started "Heathkit Educational Systems", which expanded their manuals into general electronics and computer training materials. Heathkit also expanded their expertise into digital and, eventually, computerized equipment, producing among other things digital clocks and weather stations with the new technology.

Heathkit also produced the TD-1006 light organ kit (1975), which featured a geometric star-burst pattern of 140 lights arranged in alternating color circles. The unit used four bandpass filters at 80, 350, 1000, and 3000 Hz to control red, blue, green, and amber lights respectively, creating visual effects that pulsated, exploded, and pinwheeled with the music.

Kits were compiled in small batches mostly by hand, using roller conveyor lines. These lines were put up and taken down as needed. Some kits were sold completely "assembled and tested" in the factory. These models were differentiated with a "W" suffix after the model number, indicating that they were factory-wired.

For much of Heathkit's history, there were competitors. In electronic kits: Allied Radio, an electronic parts supply house, had its KnightKits, Lafayette Radio offered some kits, Radio Shack made a few forays into this market with its Archerkit line, Dynaco made its audio products available in kit form (Dynakits), as did H. H. Scott, Inc., Fisher, and Eico; and later such companies as Southwest Technical Products and the David Hafler Company.

By 1981 Heath sold more than 400 different kits in the US, Canada, and Europe through mail order catalogs and more than 70 Heathkit Electronic Center retail stores.

== Personal computers ==
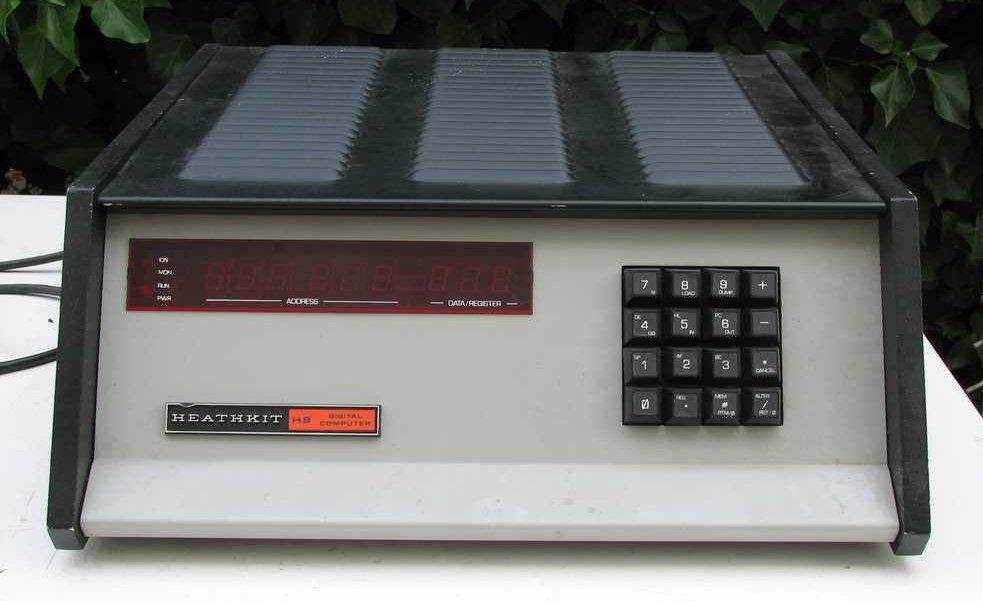
The 1978 8-bit Heathkit H8 computer

Heathkit briefly sold an analog computer in 1957. Before entering the burgeoning home computer market, Heathkit marketed and sold microprocessor-based systems aimed at learning about this technology. The ET-3400, for example, was released in 1976 and was based on the Motorola 6800 microprocessor. This system included 256 bytes of RAM, a 1k monitor in ROM, and a keypad for easy entry and modification of programs. Despite being a small trainer kit, it was powerful and flexible enough to be used in rudimentary control systems.

In 1977, the company announced two digital computer kits: Heathkit H11—based on the 16-bit DEC LSI-11—and lower-end Heathkit H8. With $90 million in sales in 1976, the company hoped that computers would soon provide more than 20% of revenue. The H8 was very successful, as were the H19 and H29 terminals, and the H89 "All in One" computer.

The H8 and H89 ran the Heathkit custom operating system HDOS as well as the popular CP/M operating system. The H89 contains two Zilog Z80 8-bit processors, one for the computer and one for the built-in H-19 terminal. The H11 was less successful, probably because it was substantially more expensive than the 8-bit computer line.

By fiscal year 1980 computers were 40% of Heathkit revenue. Seeing the potential in personal computers, Zenith Radio Company bought Heath Company from Schlumberger in 1979 for $63 million, renaming the computer division Zenith Data Systems (ZDS). Zenith purchased Heath for the flexible assembly line infrastructure at the nearby St. Joseph facility as well as the R&D assets.

Zenith invested much more in Heath than previous owners, and opened additional Heathkit Electronic Center stores that sold both Heath/Zenith and third-party products. Ready-to-assemble furniture appeared in Heathkit catalogs, manufactured by Zenith TV-cabinet factories with excess capacity. Heath/Zenith was in the vanguard of companies to start selling personal computers to small businesses. The WH-89 assembled version of the H-89 kit was re-branded as the Zenith Z-89/Z-90, an assembled all in one system with a monitor and a floppy disk drive. They had agreements with Peachtree Software to sell a customized "turn-key" version of their accounting, CPA, and real estate management software. Shortly after the release of the Z-90, they released a 10MB hard disk unit and double-density external floppy disk drives.

While the H11 was popular with hard-core hobbyists, Heath engineers realized that DEC's low-end PDP-11 microprocessors would not be able to get Heath up the road to more powerful systems at an affordable price. Heath/Zenith then designed a dual Intel 8085/8088-based system dubbed the H100 (or Z-100, in assembled form, sold by ZDS). The machine featured advanced for the day bit mapped video that allowed up to 640 x 225 pixels of 8 color graphics.

The H100 was interesting in that it could run either the CP/M operating system, or their OEM version of MS-DOS named Z-DOS, which were the two leading business PC operating systems at the time. Although the machine had to be rebooted to change modes, the competing operating systems could read each other's disks.

After hinting at a robot at the 1982 West Coast Computer Faire, that year Heath introduced the Hero-1 robot kit to teach principles of industrial robotics. The robot included a Motorola 6808 processor, ultrasonic sensor, and optionally a manipulator arm; the complete robot could be purchased assembled for $2495 or a basic kit without the arm purchased for $999. This was the first in a popular series of Heathkit robot kits sold to educational and hobbyist users.

== Kit era comes to a close ==
Selling kit computers not designed to be shipped preassembled sometimes caused problems, so the Z-100 was the first Heath/Zenith computer not designed first as a kit. By 1982 preassembled computers outsold kit versions four to one. While Heath/Zenith's computer business was successful, the growing popularity of home computers as a hobby hurt the company because many customers began writing computer programs instead of assembling Heathkits.

While their assembly was still an interesting and educational hobby, kits were no longer less expensive than preassembled products. BYTE reported in 1984 that the kit version of the Z-150 IBM PC compatible cost $100 more than the preassembled computer from some dealers, but needed about 20 hours and soldering skills to assemble. The Heathkit version of the Zenith SupersPort 286 weighs one pound more than the preassembled computer.

The continuation of the integration trend (printed circuit boards, integrated circuits, etc.), and mass production of electronics, especially computer manufacturing overseas and plug-in modules, eroded the basic Heathkit business model. Assembling a kit might still be fun, but it could no longer save much money. The switch to surface mount components and LSI ICs finally made it impossible for the home assembler to construct an electronic device for significantly less money than assembly line factory products.

By 1986 Heathkit stores were called "Heath/Zenith Computers & Electronics Centers", with "The Kit Center" one of four sections with computers, service, and training. As sales of its kits dwindled during the decade, Heath relied on its training materials and a new venture in home automation and lighting products to stay afloat. When Zenith eventually sold ZDS to Groupe Bull in 1989, Heathkit was included in the deal.

In March 1992, Heath closed its stores. By the "Heath/Zenith Computers" locations were, while still profitable, essentially computer stores for Zenith and Apple Computer products, no longer selling kits. Most floor space was used for non-retail corporate sales despite the stores' retail locations. The company also announced that it was discontinuing electronic kits after 45 years. Heath had been the last sizable survivor of a dozen kit manufacturers from the 1960s, outlasting Knightkit, Dynaco, Allied and Eico among others.

In 1995, Bull sold Heathkit to a private investor group called HIG, which then sold it to another investment group in 1998. Wanting to only concentrate on the educational products, this group sold the Heath/Zenith name and products to DESA International, a maker of specialty tools and heaters. In late 2008, Heathkit Educational Systems sold a large portion of its physical collection of legacy kit schematics and manuals along with permission to make reproductions to Don Peterson, though it still retained the copyrights and trademarks, and had pointers to people that could help with the older equipment.

DESA filed bankruptcy in December 2008. The Heathkit company existed for a few years as Heathkit Educational Systems located in Saint Joseph, Michigan, concentrating on the educational market. The Heathkit company filed for bankruptcy in 2012.

== Revival ==
In May 2013, Heathkit's corporate restructuring was announced on their website. An extensive FAQ accessible from their homepage stated clearly that Heathkit was back, and that they would resume electronic kit production and sales.

In October 2015, Heathkit circulated an email to its "insiders", who had indicated an interest in the company's progress by completing its online marketing survey. It had now secured the rights to all Heathkit designs and trademarks; secured several new patents; established new offices, warehouse space, and a factory in Santa Cruz, California; and had introduced the renewed company's first new electronic kit in decades.

Since then, Heathkit has announced and sold further kits in its new lineup of products. Limited repair service on vintage products, reprints of manuals and schematics, remaining inventories of original parts, and upgrades of some vintage models are available.

== Amateur radio ==
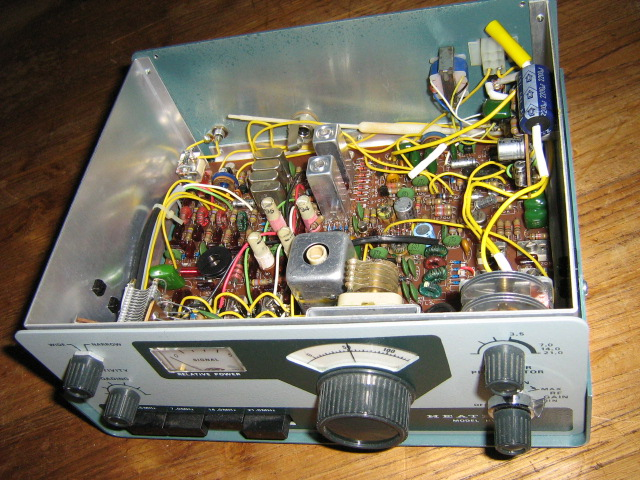
A Heathkit HW8 amateur transmitter

Heathkit made amateur radio kits almost from the beginning. In addition to their low prices compared with commercially manufactured equipment, Heathkits appealed to amateurs who had an interest in building their own equipment, but did not necessarily have the expertise or desire to design it and obtain all the parts themselves. They expanded and enhanced their line of amateur radio gear through nearly four decades. By the late 1960s, Heathkit had as large a selection of ham equipment as any company in the field.

== See also ==
- History of personal computers
- Homebuilt aircraft
- Vintage amateur radio
