= Electronic kit =

Collection of electronic parts

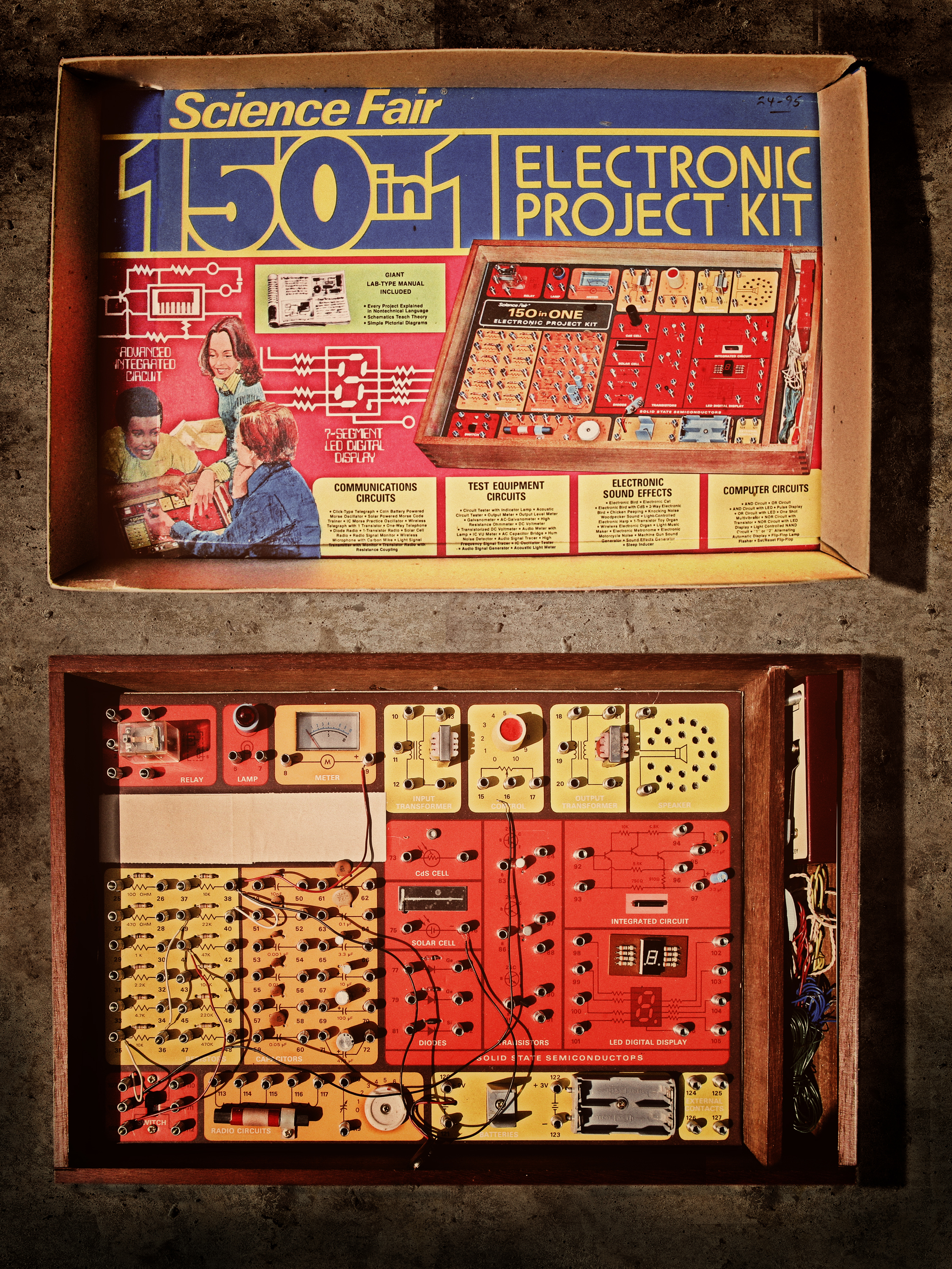
1980s Electronic Project Kit promoted by Radio Shack

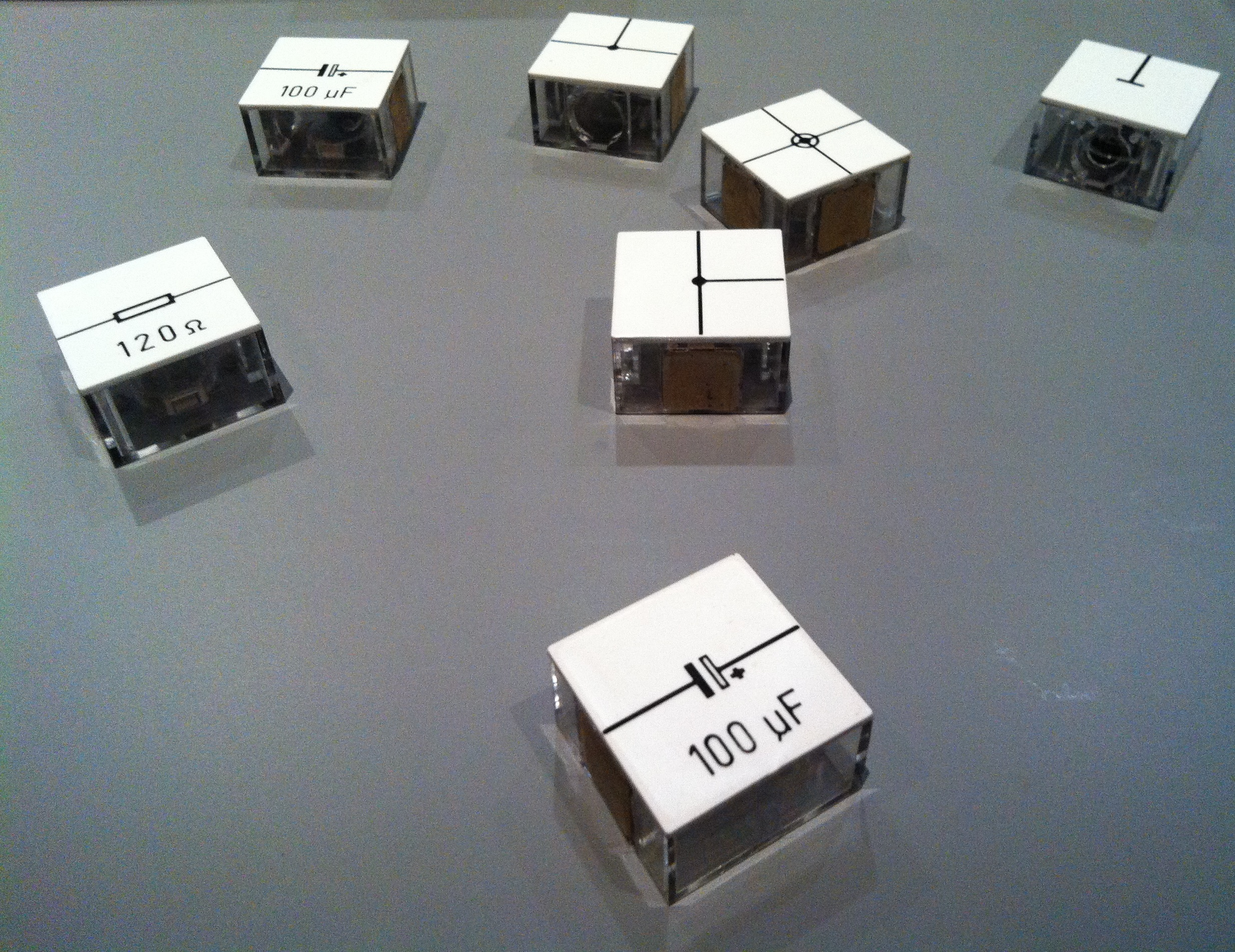
1960s Braun Lectron elements (Design Museum of Barcelona)

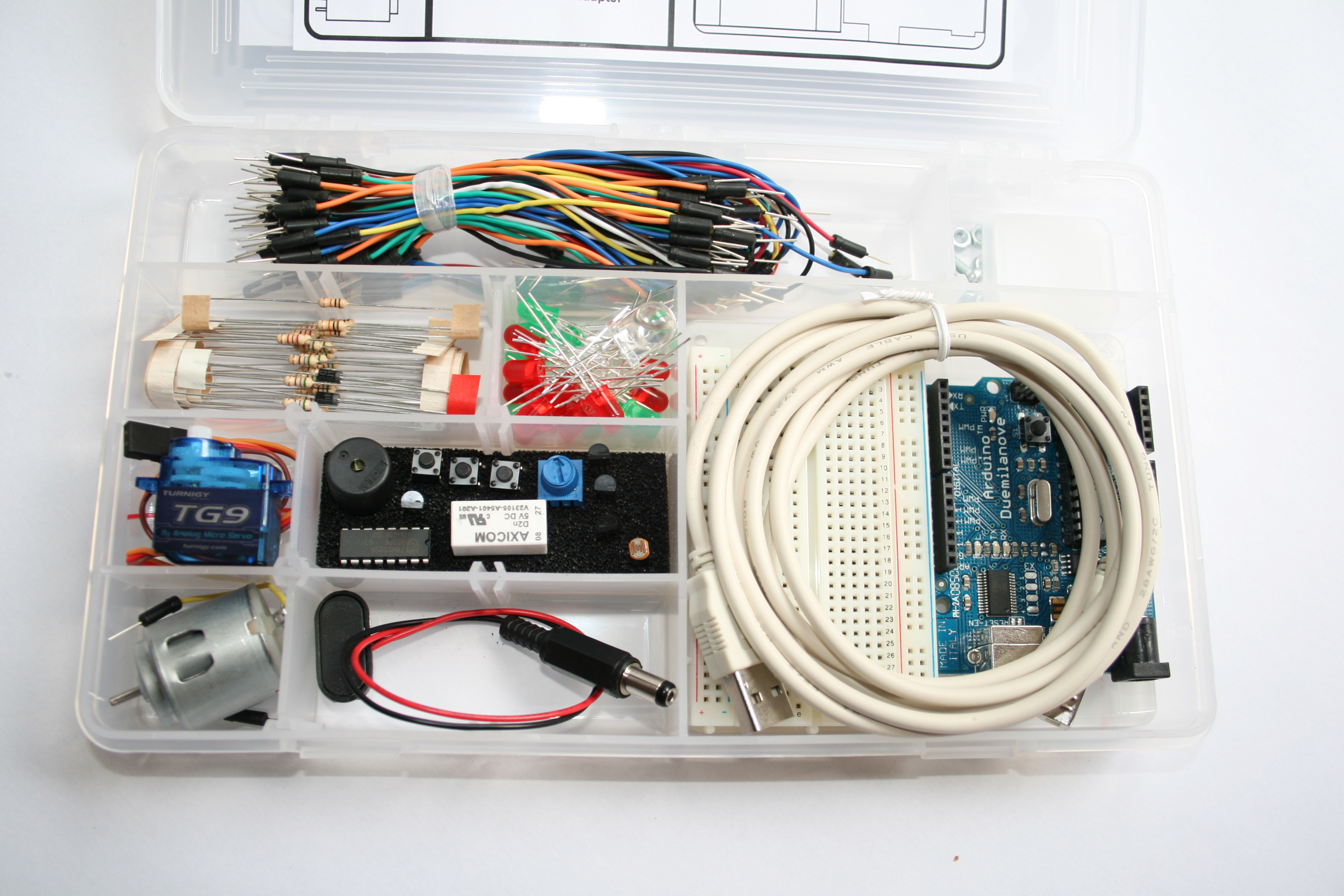
Arduino Experimentation Kit

An electronic kit is a package of electrical components used to build an electronic device. Generally, kits are composed of electronic components, a circuit diagram (schematic), assembly instructions, and often a printed circuit board (PCB) or another type of prototyping board.

There are two types of kits. Some build a single device or system. Other types used for education demonstrate a range of circuits. These will include a solderless construction board of some type, such as:

- Components mounted in plastic blocks with side contacts, that are held together in a base, e.g. Denshi blocks
- Springs on a card board, the springs trap wire leads, or component leads, such as Philips EE electronic experiment kits. These are a cheap and flexible option
- Professional type prototyping boards, (breadboards) into which component leads are inserted, following documentation of the "kit".

The first type of kit for constructing a single device normally uses a PCB on which components are soldered. It normally comes with extensive documentation describing which component goes where on the PCB.

For advanced hobby projects, sometimes the kit may only consist of a printed circuit board and assembly instructions, and the purchaser may have to source all the parts independently; or, the vendor may provide hard-to-get or pre-programmed parts while expecting the purchaser to obtain the rest of the components.

People primarily purchase electronic kits to have fun and learn how things work. They were once popular as a means to reduce the cost of buying goods, but there is usually no cost saving in buying a kit today.

Some electronic kits were assembled to make complete complex devices such as color television sets, oscilloscopes, high-end audio amplifiers, amateur radio equipment, electric organs, and even computers such as the Heathkit H-8, and the LNW-80. Many of the early microprocessor computers were sold as either electronic kits or assembled and tested. Heathkit sold millions of electronic kits during its 45-year history.

Home assembly of common consumer electronics items no longer provides a cost advantage over commercially manufactured and distributed devices. People still build kits for custom devices and special-purpose electronics for professional and educational use and as a hobby.

Also emerging is a trend to simplify the complexity by providing preprogrammed or modular kits often provided by many suppliers online. The fun and thrill of making your own electronics has shifted, in many cases, from easy-to-comprehend applications and analog devices to more sophisticated digital devices.

== Examples ==
- The Altair 8800 (the first home computer) was also sold as a kit, as were the MK14, Sinclair ZX80, Sinclair ZX81 and Acorn Atom computers.
- Many S-100 bus system cards were sold only as kits.
- Building a Robot kit, most often with a micro controller inside, is now in fashion.

== See also ==
- Maker culture
- List of free electronics circuit simulators
