= Heathkit H8 =

1970s microcomputer

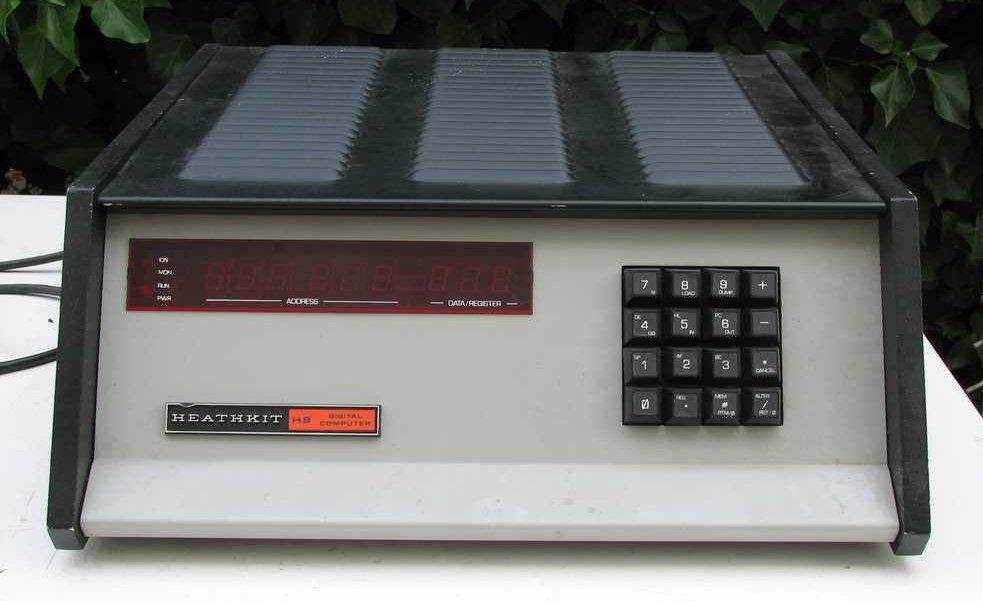
- First eight-bit Heathkit H8 computer
- Developer: Heathkit
- Manufacturer: Heathkit
- Type: Microcomputer
- Released: 1977; 49 years ago
- Operating system: CP/M, HDOS
- CPU: Intel 8080A

Heathkit's H8 is an Intel 8080A-based microcomputer sold in kit form starting in 1977. The H8 is similar to the S-100 bus computers of the era, and like those machines is often used with the CP/M operating system on floppy disk.

The main difference between the H8 and S-100 machines is the bus; the H8 uses a 50-pin bus design that was smaller, more robust and better engineered electrically. The machine also includes a bootstrap ROM that makes it easier to start up, including code for running basic input/output and allowing input through a front-mounted octal keypad and front panel display, instead of the binary switches and lights used on machines like the Altair 8800.

The H8 requires a separate terminal to be truly useful; Heathkit introduced several terminals as well. A successor model, the "All-in-One" Heathkit H89, combines a Z80 processor board and a floppy disk drive into the cabinet of an Heathkit H19 terminal. This model also was sold in fully assembled form as the WH89. These were later sold by Zenith Electronics with their name on the front as the Zenith Z-89.

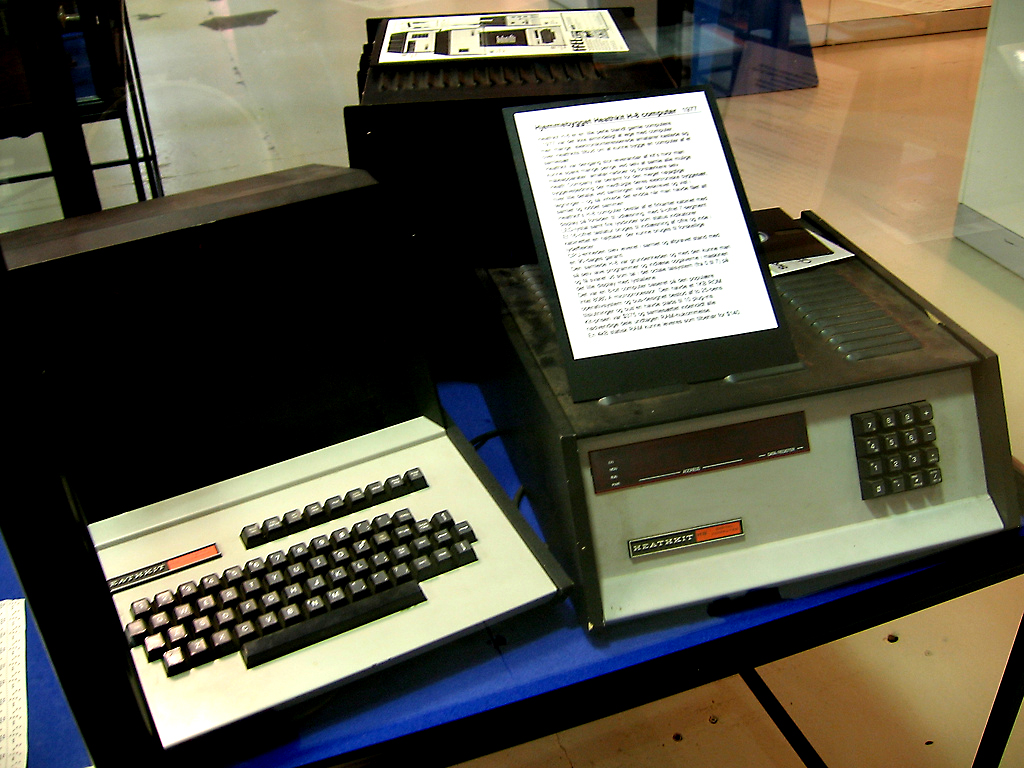
Heathkit H8 (right) and H9 video terminal (left)

== History ==
=== Background ===
MITS announced the Altair 8800 in January 1975 and started selling kits soon after. Marketed to electronics hobbyists through trade magazines like Popular Electronics, the company founders felt there would be limited appeal and expected to sell only a few hundred systems. Instead, they received orders for thousands in the first month. Sales were so much greater than expected that MITS was unable to clear the order backlog for the better part of the year.

The Altair sparked off such intense interest in the microcomputer world that a number of other companies jumped in to fill the sales backlog, building machines that were clones of the Altair. The primary component of this design is the S-100 bus, so named because it uses a 100-pin edge connector that MITS found at bargain prices when they were designing the machine. Unfortunately, the pins are connected from the backplane with a disorganized layout, and it has a number of problems that make it unreliable.

Standardization led to a flourishing of companies selling into the S-100 market. The introduction of floppy disk controllers and the disk-based CP/M operating system dramatically improved the system's capabilities and started the process of turning them into practical small-business tools. By the late 1970s they were beginning to displace minicomputers and other systems in a number of roles.

=== H8 ===
Heathkit was a long-established player in the electronics market, making kits for products that had proven themselves in the market. Some of these were quite complex, including a color television. The company had considered designing a kit computer as early as 1974, but concluded that it was not a good fit for their traditional market. The successful launch of the Altair changed things, and in 1977 Heathkit decided to design a kit similar to the Altair but addressing its more obvious shortcomings. The H8 was announced in July 1977 and started selling that fall at a price of $379.

For full functionality, the system also requires a 4 KiB SRAM card ($139) and some form of storage controller; at a minimum this would be the H10 paper tape punch/reader or the H8-5 Serial I/O card ($110) which controls a cassette tape, using a 1200-baud variant of the Kansas City standard format. Another common accessory is the H9 video terminal, which is also driven by the H8-5 card; although any serial terminal will suffice. The H9 is limited to upper case characters and 12 display lines, and uses a cheap array of switches for its keyboard. It was eventually superseded by the H19 terminal, a more ergonomic design, and capable of lower-case and graphic-like characters. The H19 became a major product line of its own. The H17 floppy disk system became available in 1978, normally sold with one drive but expandable with a second (and later to three). Use of the H17 requires at least 16 KiB of RAM. The H8 can run CP/M, and often did, but early machines require either a special version of CP/M that was "org'd" at 8 KiB instead of zero, or a small hardware modification and an updated ROM to do so. Heath also offered HDOS, which was written by Gordon Letwin. Letwin later went to Microsoft and was chief architect of OS/2.

At the time the H8 was introduced, the computer market was in the midst of a shift from the hobby market that had spawned it to a "user" market that purchased pre-assembled machines. Heath followed this trend and introduced the WH8 in fully assembled form for $475. Like the H8, the WH8 requires several other cards for functionality. The disk drive system came fully assembled as the WH17. For the CP/M operating system, Heathkit provided the WH67, a 10 MB eight-inch hard drive and the H47 eight-inch floppy disk system.

=== H89 ===
In 1978 Heath introduced the Heathkit H88 which integrated the H19 terminal and a new Zilog Z80-based single-board processor into the case of the H19. A version with a disk drive incorporated to the right of the terminal screen became the H89. The machines bear a strong resemblance to the TRS-80 Model III and similar all-in-one computers. The H89 was sold both in kit form for $1595, and fully assembled form as the WH89 for $2295.

Soon after the introduction of the H89, Heathkit was purchased by Zenith, who were looking to enter the microcomputer market. They continued sales of the H89 with their own labeling on the front as the Zenith Z89. Eventually, Zenith Data Systems (Heathkit plus the computer division of Zenith) was purchased by Bull HN (CII Bull, Honeywell and Nippon Electric) because they needed a US maker of microcomputers to comply with government purchase requirements. Kit sales were ended soon after that purchase.

== Description ==
Heath chose not to implement the S-100 bus and instead created their own, known as "Benton Harbor Bus" after their home town. The H8 is packaged in a box-like chassis with pressboard sides and metal sheeting for the rest of the case. The top sheet is heavily perforated to form cooling vents.

The machine is built up from the backplane mounted on the right-hand side panel of the case, with ten 50-pin card slots. The first and last slots are spaced differently from the rest, and the power supplies occupy some of the space needed for the last card. This means that the last card not only has to accommodate the narrow spacing but also cannot be full-length, leaving eight "standard" slots available for full-length cards. The front panel plugs into the first slot and the CPU plugs into the second, leaving seven for further expansion. The card slots are arranged on an angle, which allows the case to be reduced in height. Each card contains its own voltage regulators, using the Z-shaped mounting bracket as a heat-sink. (Power distribution on the backplane is unregulated +8V and +/-18V; the cards regulate these to their requirements, typically +5V and +/-12V.)

Another notable change is the replacement of the front-panel toggle switches and lights of a standard early-model S-100 system with a keypad and seven-segment LED display (early S-100 machines like the Altair or IMSAI 8080 contain no ROM and when they are started, the user "keys in" a program via the toggle switches to read a paper tape. Once this "loader" program is ready, a paper tape containing a more complete loader can be read in, allowing the user to load programs from cassette or floppy disk).

On the H8, all of this code is already pre-installed in a 1 KiB ROM in a monitor program known as "PAM8", occupying locations 0 through 3FF_{16} and the H17 disk I/O drivers used for booting, occupying a 2 KiB ROM occupying locations 1800_{16} through 1FFF_{16} The ROM contains code to control the keypad and display, booting it directly into an operable state. Several versions of the PAM-8 ROM were sold as upgrades; at one point Heathkit switched to using 2 KiB ROMs, occupying through 7FF_{16} and subsequently to a 4 KiB ROM occupying through FFF_{16}. The ROMs interfere with the operation of standard CP/M, which assumes it can write the memory near location 0, in particular the interrupt handler pointers.

PAM8 and portions of HDOS use an unusual address notation called "split octal" where 16-bit numbers are split into two 8-bit numbers printed in octal: the first location was "000.000" and the location after "000.377" was "001.000". In order to distinguish numbers in split-octal notation from 16-bit octal numbers, the two digit groups are often separated by a special symbol. Most mini- and micro-computers use either straight octal (377 was followed by 400) or hexadecimal.) With the introduction of the optional HA8-6 Z-80 processor replacement for the 8080 board, the front-panel keyboard got a new set of labels and hexadecimal notation replaced octal.

Heath/Zenith ended H8 manufacturing in 1981 because its design did not comply with FCC Part 15 regulations.

== Benton Harbor Bus ==
The 50-pin Benton Harbor Bus was considered technically superior to the S-100 bus. The 50-pin bus of the H8 contains sixteen address lines, eight data lines, five interrupt lines, and the system control lines. Like the S-100 bus, it does not supply +5 V; each card is expected to have its own local +5 V regulator powered from "unregulated" +8 V on the bus. The bus is laid out to avoid the electrical problems of the S-100 system (like +8V and -16V being placed beside each other).

H8 engineers cited several reasons for not using the S-100 bus: The bus was glitchy and it would not have fit the cabinet. The Benton Harbor bus was less expensive and Heath did not want to encourage customers dissatisfied with "weird hardware accessories" to blame the company. Regardless of the reason, H8 customers became dissatisfied with not being able to use the many S-100 products; Heath attempted to compensate by releasing Benton Harbor Bus-compatible accessories. A Heath owner complained in 1983, however, that Heath/Zenith's prices were much higher than equivalents for other computers.

== Benton Harbor BASIC ==
Heathkit also introduced their own dialect of the BASIC programming language. Two versions were available, Benton Harbor BASIC that supported the most basic commands and lacked string variables, and Extended Benton Harbor BASIC which required at least 24 kB of memory and added string variables, integer types, and commands for working directly with the floppy disk without having to exit to CP/M or the monitor. Modelled on Dartmouth BASIC, as opposed to popular later variations like HP Time-Shared BASIC or Microsoft BASIC, the language had a number of idiosyncrasies.

== See also ==
- Heathkit H11
- Zenith Z89
