= Z-DOS =

- Developer: Microsoft
- Written in: PL/M (BIOS)
- OS family: MS-DOS
- Working state: Historic, Unsupported
- Available in: English
- Package manager: N/A
- Supported platforms: Intel 8088, Zenith Z-100
- Default user interface: Command-line interface
- License: Proprietary

Z-DOS is a discontinued OEM version of Microsoft's MS-DOS specifically adapted to run on the hardware of the Zenith Z-100 personal computer.

== Overview ==
Z-DOS is Zenith Data Systems's name for a version of Microsoft's MS-DOS operating system designed for the Zenith Z-100 computer. The Z-100 uses a 8086-family microprocessor, (the Intel 8088), but otherwise has a completely different internal architecture from the IBM PC.

Z-DOS differences from standard MS-DOS include additional utilities and programmable function keys. MS-DOS was not specifically designed to any specific hardware platform, but can be tailored to run on most any system as long as it uses a 8086-compatible microprocessor, a situation similar to CP/M, which typically uses a 8080-compatible (8080, 8085 and Z80 among others) microprocessor. In order to achieve this, MS-DOS, like CP/M, relies on a platform-specific (DOS-)BIOS, which is written for the target machine, so that the hardware-independent DOS kernel can run on it. Beside IBM's OEM version of MS-DOS released as PC DOS there are dozens of other OEM versions of MS-DOS designed for a specific non-IBM-compatible OEM hardware—among them Zenith's Z-DOS. When almost 100% IBM-compatible clones became the norm, "MS-DOS" became the generic version which could run on most of them. Later such generic versions of MS-DOS cannot run on older non-IBM-compatible machines like the Z-100.

== See also ==
- DOS API
- List of DOS commands
- Timeline of DOS operating systems
