= Influence of the IBM PC on the personal computer market =

Impact of 1981 American microcomputer model

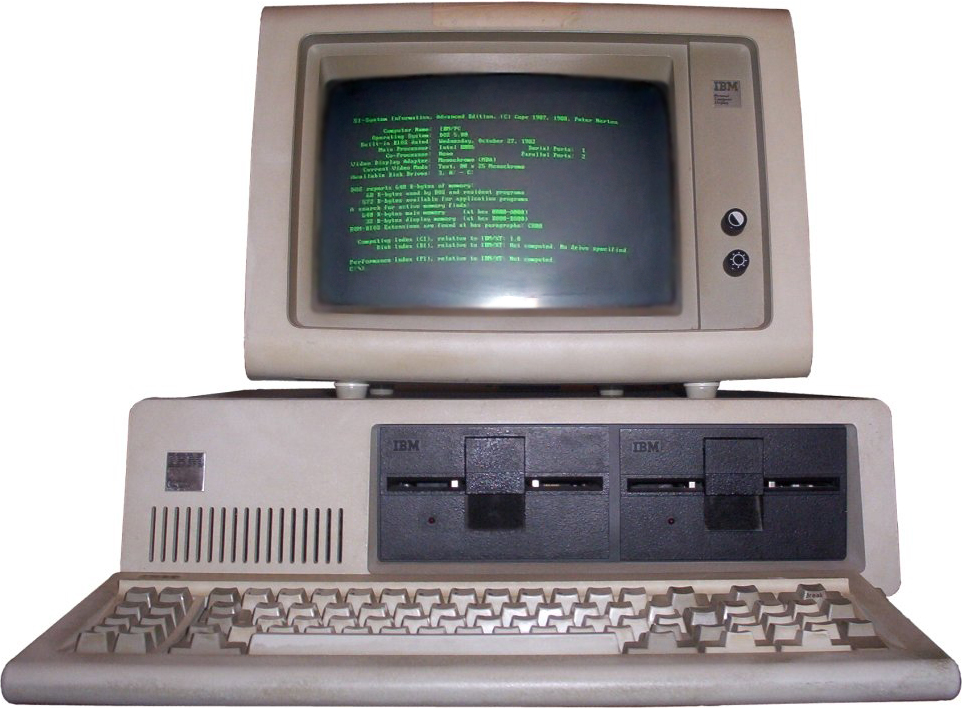
The IBM Personal Computer (model 5150)

Following the introduction of the IBM Personal Computer (IBM PC) in 1981, many other personal computer architectures became extinct within just a few years. It led to a wave of IBM PC compatible systems being released.

== Before the IBM PC's introduction ==
Before the IBM PC was introduced, the personal computer market was dominated by systems using the 6502 and Z80 8-bit microprocessors, such as the TRS 80, PET, and Apple II, which used proprietary operating systems, and by computers running CP/M. After IBM introduced the IBM PC, it was not until 1984 that IBM PC and clones became the dominant computers. In 1983, Byte forecast that by 1990, IBM would command only 11% of business computer sales. Commodore was predicted to hold a slim lead in a highly competitive market, at 11.9%.

Around 1978, several 16-bit CPUs became available. Examples included the Data General mN601, the Fairchild 9440, the Ferranti F100-L, the General Instrument CP1600 and CP1610, the National Semiconductor INS8900, Panafacom's MN1610, Texas Instruments' TMS9900, and, most notably, the Intel 8086. These new processors were expensive to incorporate in personal computers, as they used a 16-bit data bus and needed rare (and thus expensive) 16-bit peripheral and support chips.

More than 50 new business-oriented personal computer systems came on the market in the year before IBM released the IBM PC. Very few of them used a 16- or 32-bit microprocessor, as 8-bit systems were generally believed by the vendors to be perfectly adequate, and the Intel 8086 was too expensive to use.

Some of the main manufacturers selling 8-bit business systems during this period were:

- Acorn Computers
- Apple Computer
- Atari Inc.
- Commodore International
- Cromemco
- Digital Equipment Corporation
- Durango Systems Inc.
- Hewlett-Packard
- InterSystems
- Morrow Designs
- North Star Computers
- Ohio Scientific
- Olivetti
- Processor Technology
- Sharp
- South West Technical Products Corporation
- Tandy Corporation
- Zenith Data Systems/Heathkit

== The IBM PC ==
On August 12, 1981, IBM released the IBM Personal Computer. One of the most far-reaching decisions made for IBM PC was to use an open architecture, leading to a large market for third party add-in boards and applications; but finally also to many competitors all creating "IBM-compatible" machines.

The IBM PC used the then-new Intel 8088 processor. Like other 16-bit CPUs, it could access up to 1 megabyte of RAM, but it used an 8-bit-wide data bus to memory and peripherals. This design allowed use of the large, readily available, and relatively inexpensive family of 8-bit-compatible support chips. IBM decided to use the Intel 8088 after first considering the Motorola 68000 and the Intel 8086, because the other two were considered to be too powerful for their needs. Although already established rivals like Apple and Radio Shack had many advantages over the company new to microcomputers, IBM's reputation in business computing allowed the IBM PC architecture to take a substantial market share of business applications, and many small companies that sold IBM-compatible software or hardware rapidly grew in size and importance, including Tecmar, Quadram, AST Research, and Microsoft.

As of mid-1982, three other mainframe and minicomputer companies sold microcomputers, but unlike IBM, Hewlett-Packard, Xerox, and Control Data Corporation chose the CP/M operating system. Many other companies made "business personal computers" using their own proprietary designs, some still using 8-bit microprocessors. The ones that used Intel x86 processors often used the generic, non-IBM-compatible specific version of MS-DOS or CP/M-86, just as 8-bit systems with an Intel 8080 compatible CPU normally used CP/M.

== The use of MS-DOS on non-IBM PC compatible systems ==
[Bill] Gates predicts that in the next six to nine months, several 8086 machines will be introduced. Just because a machine is based on the same processor, he explains, does not mean that all PC software will run on it. In some cases, software bypasses the operating system and uses specific hardware characteristics of the PC.

— InfoWorld, 23 August 1982

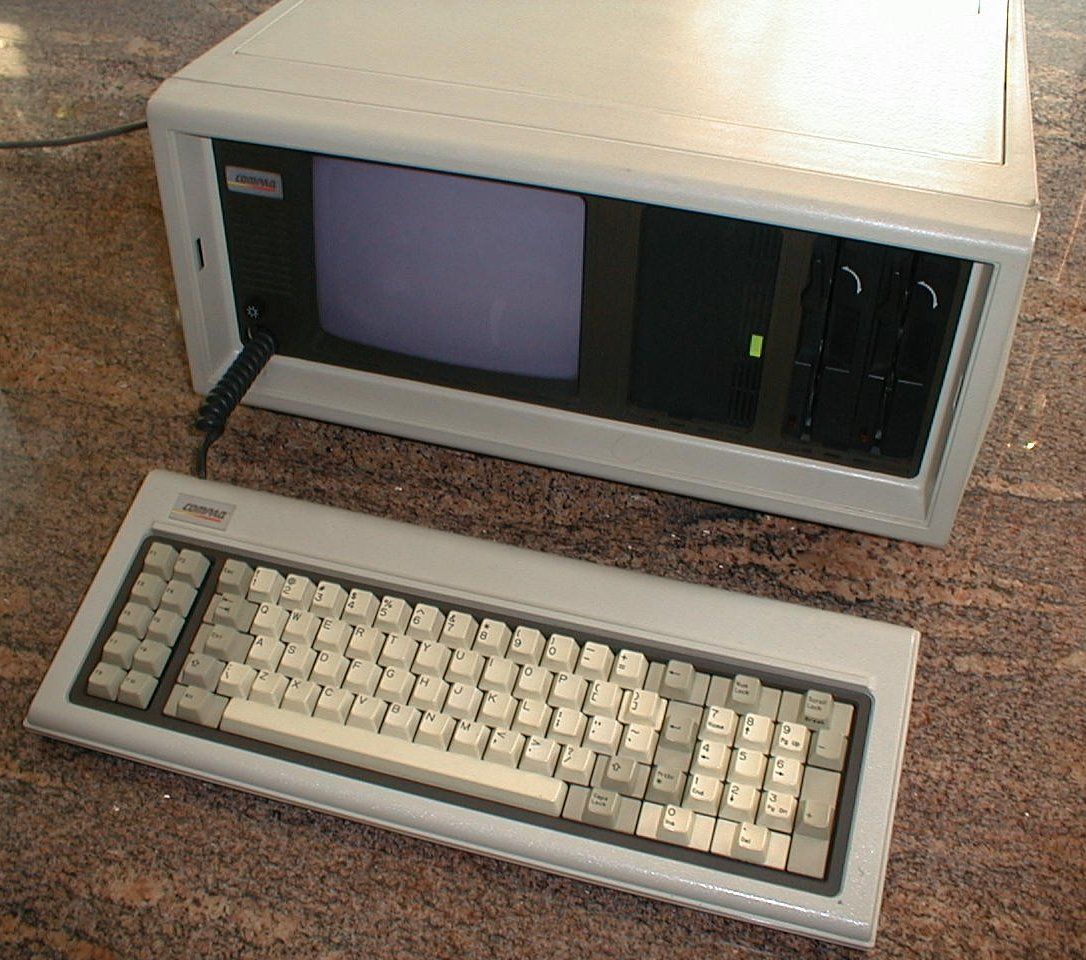
Compaq Portable

Within a year of the IBM PC's introduction, Microsoft—the developer of its primary operating system, IBM PC DOS—licensed the operating system generically as MS-DOS to over 70 other companies. The first computer to achieve 100% PC compatibility was the Compaq Portable, released in November 1982, and it included a clean-room engineered BIOS; it remained the most compatible clone into 1984. Before the PC dominated the market, however, most systems were not clones of the IBM PC design, but had different internal designs, and ran Digital Research's CP/M. Also, Compaq did not offer its clean-room engineered BIOS to other computer manufacturers.

By early 1983 the PC's MS-DOS and Intel 8088 had become a standard to emulate; an example is the TI Professional, which does not use the company's own 16-bit CPU. TI, Wang Laboratories, Zenith Data Systems, and others with existing proprietary systems offered MS-DOS systems with some amount of IBM compatibility. The IBM PC was difficult to obtain for several years after its introduction, but many vendors intentionally avoided full IBM compatibility because they expected that the market for what InfoWorld described as "ordinary PC clones" would decline. They feared the fate of companies that sold computers plug-compatible with IBM mainframes in the 1960s and 1970s—many of which went bankrupt after IBM changed specifications—and believed that a market existed for personal computers with a similar selection of software to the IBM PC, but with different, superior hardware. Benjamin Rosen was an investor in Compaq, but his Rosen Electronics Letter predicted in February 1983 that the Professional "should be one of the year's bigger successes" despite not 100% compatible. Many vendors used such an approach into 1984.

While Microsoft used a sophisticated installer with its DOS programs like Multiplan that provided device drivers for many non IBM PC-compatible computers, most other software vendors did not. Columbia University discussed the difficulty of having Kermit support many different clones and MS-DOS computers. Peter Norton, who earlier had encouraged vendors to write software that ran on many different computers, by early 1985 admitted—after experiencing the difficulty of doing so while rewriting Norton Utilities—that "there's no practical way for most software creators to write generic software". Although TI launched the Professional with more than 100 software packages available immediately, dealers found carrying multiple versions of software for clones of varying levels of compatibility to be difficult.

To get the best results out of the 8088's modest performance, many popular software applications were written specifically for the IBM PC. The developers of these programs opted to write directly to the computer's (video) memory and peripheral chips, bypassing MS-DOS and the BIOS. For example, a program might directly update the video refresh memory, instead of using MS-DOS calls and device drivers to alter the appearance of the screen. Many notable software packages, such as the spreadsheet program Lotus 1-2-3, and Microsoft's Microsoft Flight Simulator 1.0, directly accessed the IBM PC's hardware, bypassing the BIOS, and therefore did not work on computers that were even trivially different from the IBM PC. This was especially common among PC games. As a result, the systems that were not fully IBM PC-compatible could not run this software, and quickly became obsolete. Rendered obsolete with them was the CP/M-inherited concept of OEM versions of MS-DOS meant to run (through BIOS calls) on non IBM-PC hardware.

=== Cloning the PC BIOS ===
In 1984, Phoenix Technologies began licensing its clone of the IBM PC BIOS. The Phoenix BIOS and competitors such as AMI BIOS made it possible for anyone to market a PC compatible computer, without having to develop a compatible BIOS like Compaq.

=== Decline of the Intel 80186 ===
Although based on the i8086 and enabling the creation of relatively low-cost x86-based systems, the Intel 80186 quickly lost appeal for x86-based PC builders because the supporting circuitry inside the Intel 80186 chip was incompatible with those used in the standard PC chipset as implemented by IBM. It was very rarely used in personal computers after 1982.

== Domination of the clones ==
=== "Is it PC compatible?" ===
Imagine that Cray computer decides to make a personal computer. It has a 100 MHz processor, 20 megabytes of RAM, 500 megabytes of disk storage, a screen resolution of 1024 X 1024 pixels, relies entirely on voice recognition for input, fits in your shirt pocket and costs $3,000. What's the first question that the computer community asks? "Is it PC compatible?"

— InfoWorld, February 1984

You don't ask whether a new machine is fast or slow, new technology or old. The first question is, "Is it PC compatible?"

— Creative Computing, November 1984

What does IBM know about compatibility anyway?

— Rod Canion of Compaq, July 1984

While predicting success for the TI Professional in 1983, Rosen Electronics Letter added "we'd rather it had been completely compatible with the PC", stating that "we know of one case (and there will be many)" where a customer chose the PC because of "the name, the trustworthiness and most important of all the identity of IBM". One year after the Rosen prediction, BYTE described how "the personal computer market seems to be shadowed under a cloud of compatibility: the drive to be compatible with the IBM Personal Computer family has assumed near-fetish proportions", which it stated was "inevitable in the light of the phenomenal market acceptance of the IBM PC". The magazine cited the announcement by North Star in fall 1983 of its first PC-compatible microcomputer. Founded in 1976, North Star had long been successful with 8-bit S-100 bus products, and had introduced proprietary 16-bit products, but now the company acknowledged that the IBM PC had become a "standard", one which North Star needed to follow. BYTE described the announcement as representative of the great impact IBM had made on the industry:

It's become painfully obvious that the key to survival as a major manufacturer is acceptance by the business community. The IBM PC has unquestionably opened the door to that market wider than any personal computer before it, but in so doing has made compatibility a primary factor in microcomputer design, for better or for worse. Recent announcements by North Star ... and a host of smaller firms seem to indicate that the 8088/MS-DOS/IBM-compatible bandwagon is becoming much more like a speeding freight train.

The magazine worried in 1984 that "IBM's burgeoning influence in the PC community is stifling innovation because so many other companies are mimicking Big Blue". Those that had "tried to improve on the PC standard", InfoWorld wrote, "unanimously got burned [and] stifled innovation". The TI and Wang computers were among the failures, as were the DEC and Data General products, despite TI's good reviews and others' success in competing against IBM minicomputers. Even IBM's mainframe rivals, the BUNCH, introduced their own compatibles despite earlier viewing such a small computer as a "toy"; they and other vendors of large computers had lost sales to existing customers that would have preferred to buy from them if possible. Sperry stated that its clone was "late to the dance" so as to be more compatible. When Hewlett-Packard (HP) introduced the Vectra in 1985, InfoWorld stated that the company was "responding to demands from its customers for full IBM PC compatibility". By contrast, as late as 1991, Computerworld wrote of DEC's inability to sell PCs to its customers, which bought them from HP, Compaq, and others.

Some of the largest vendors, like Honeywell Information Systems and Tandem Computers, explicitly admitted that their products were not innovative, but were what customers wanted. John V. Lombardi wrote in InfoWorld that the Epson Equity "is the least innovative [of Epson computers] and, ironically, is probably the most likely to succeed. It is in every way a plain vanilla IBM PC clone". Stating that compatibles were a commodity like televisions with falling prices, Zenith Data Systems's CEO said "Basically, we move boxes".

Admitting that "it's what our dealers asked for", Kaypro introduced the company's first IBM compatible in 1984. Tandy—which had once had as much as 60% of the personal-computer market, but had attempted to keep technical information secret to monopolize software and peripheral sales—also began selling non-proprietary computers; four years after its Jon Shirley predicted to InfoWorld that the new IBM PC's "major market would be IBM addicts", the magazine in 1985 called the IBM compatibility of the Tandy 1000 "no small concession to Big Blue's dominating stranglehold" by a company that had been "struggling openly in the blood-soaked arena of personal computers". The 1000 is compatible with the PC but not compatible with the company's own Tandy 2000 MS-DOS computer.

I believe that the era when a machine could be introduced successfully into the marketplace with a total dearth of software ended abruptly with the Macintosh. And those days will not return.

— Creative Computing, February 1985

Mitch Kapor of Lotus Development Corporation said in 1984 that "either you have to be PC-compatible or very special". "Compatibility has proven to be the only safe path", Microsoft executive Jim Harris stated in 1985, while InfoWorld wrote that IBM's competitors were "whipped into conformity" with its designs, because of "the total failure of every company that tried to improve on the IBM PC". Customers only wanted to run PC applications like 1-2-3, and developers only cared about the massive PC installed base, so any non-compatible—no matter its technical superiority—from a company other than Apple failed for lack of customers and software. Compatibility became so important that Dave Winer joked that year (referring to the PC AT's incomplete compatibility with the IBM PC), "The only company that can introduce a machine that isn't PC compatible and survive is IBM".

By 1985, the shortage of IBM PCs had ended, causing financial difficulties for many vendors of compatibles; nonetheless, Harris said, "The only ones that have done worse than the compatibles are the noncompatibles". Almost every major computer company offered its own AT compatibles, including vendors that were late to offer PC compatibles; they "see this as a second chance to hitch a ride on the Boca Raton steamroller", InfoWorld said. The PC standard was similarly dominant in Europe, with Honeywell Bull, Olivetti, and Ericsson selling compatibles and software companies focusing on PC products. By the end of the year PC Magazine stated that "IBM has to continue to be IBM compatible or forfeit its market position" when discussing a rumored IBM proprietary, non-compatible operating system. Noting that the company's unsuccessful PCjr's "cardinal sin was that it wasn't PC compatible", the magazine wrote that "backward compatibility [with the IBM PC] is the single largest concern of hardware and software developers. The user community is too large and demanding to accept radical changes or abandon solutions that have worked in the past".

Within a few years of the introduction of fully compatible PC clones, almost all rival business personal computer systems, and alternate x86 using architectures, were gone from the market. Despite the inherent dangers of an industry based on a de facto "standard", a thriving PC clone industry emerged. The only other non-IBM PC-compatible systems that remained were those systems that were classified as home computers, such as the Apple II, or business systems that offered features not available on the IBM PC, such as a high level of integration (e.g., bundled accounting and inventory) or fault-tolerance and multitasking and multi-user features.

=== Wave of inexpensive clones ===
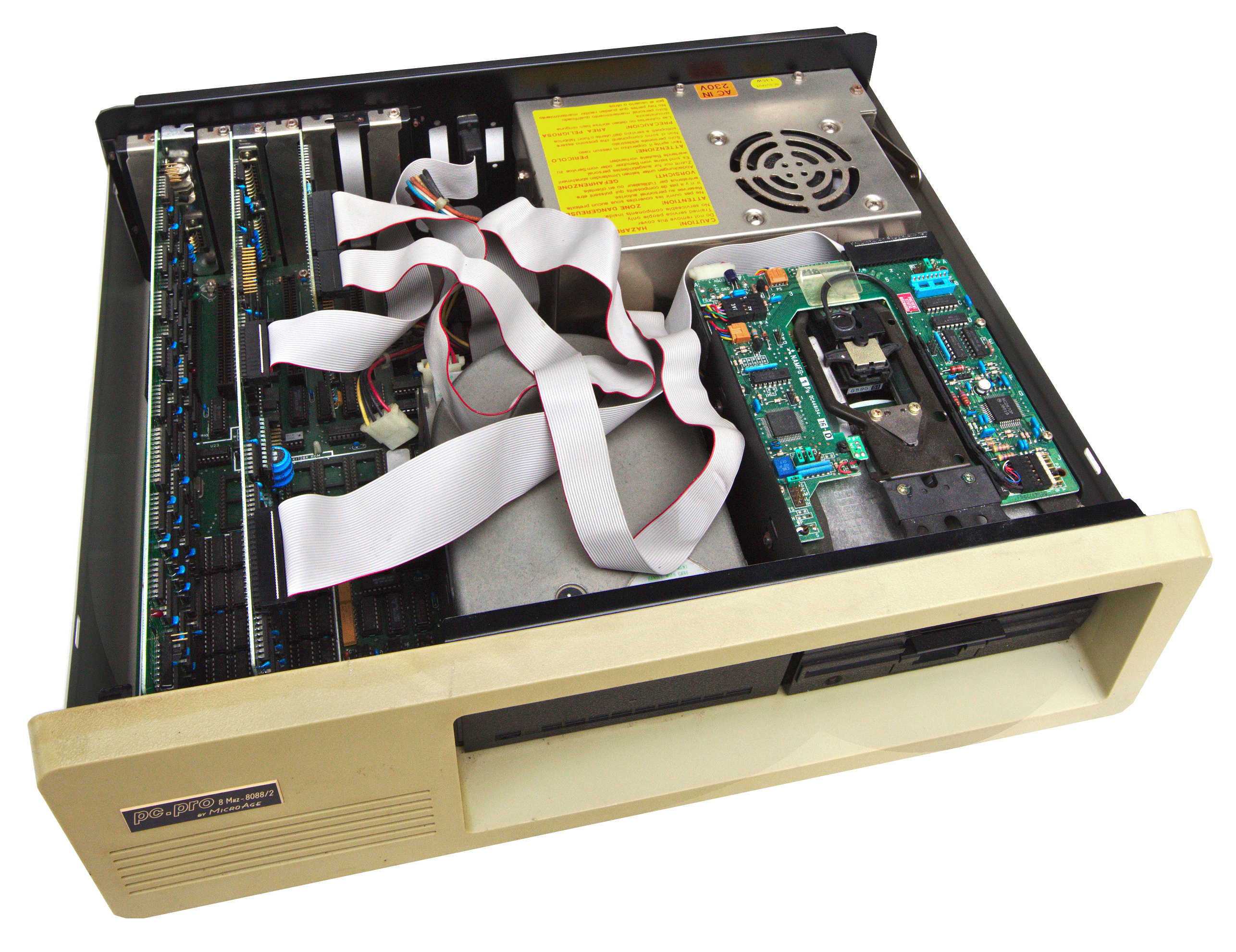
Internal view of an IBM PC compatible computer

Compaq's prices were comparable to IBM's, and the company emphasized its PC compatibles' features and quality to corporate customers. From mid-1985, what Compute! described as a "wave" of inexpensive clones from American and Asian companies caused prices to decline; by the end of 1986, the equivalent to a $1,600 real IBM PC with 256K RAM and two disk drives cost as little as $600, lower than the price of the Apple IIc. Consumers began purchasing DOS computers for the home in large numbers; Tandy estimated that half of its 1000 sales went to homes, the new Leading Edge Model D comprised 1% of the US home-computer market that year, and toy and discount stores sold a clone manufactured by Hyundai—the Blue Chip PC—like a stereo, without a demonstrator model or salesman.

Tandy and other inexpensive clones succeeded with consumers—who saw them as superior to lower-end game machines—where IBM failed two years earlier with the PCjr. They were as inexpensive as home computers of a few years earlier, and comparable in price to the Amiga, Atari ST, and Apple IIGS. Unlike the PCjr, clones were as fast as or faster than the IBM PC and highly compatible so users could bring work home; the large DOS software library reassured those worried about orphaned technology. Consumers used them for both spreadsheets and entertainment, with the former ability justifying buying a computer that could also perform the latter. PCs and compatibles also gained a significant share of the educational market, while longtime leader Apple lost share.

At the January 1987 Consumer Electronics Show, both Commodore and Atari announced their own clones. By 1987 the PC industry was growing so quickly that the formerly business-only platform had become the largest and most important market for computer game companies, outselling games for the Apple II or Commodore 64. By 1988 Computer Gaming World agreed with Joel Billings of Strategic Simulations, that an inexpensive PC clone with EGA graphics was superior for games. MS-DOS software was 77% of all personal computer software sold by dollar value in the third quarter of 1988, up 47% year over year. By 1989 80% of readers of Compute! owned DOS computers, and the magazine announced "greater emphasis on MS-DOS home computing".

Compaq president Rod Canion asked "What does IBM know about compatibility anyway?", bragging that his computers were more PC compatible than IBM's PC XT or Portable PC. IBM's influence on the industry decreased, as competition increased and rivals introduced computers that improved on IBM's designs while maintaining compatibility. In 1986 the Compaq Deskpro 386 was the first computer based on the Intel 80386. In 1987 IBM unsuccessfully attempted to regain leadership of the market with the Personal System/2 line and proprietary MicroChannel Architecture.

=== Clones conquer the home ===
By 1990, Computer Gaming World told a reader complaining about the many reviews of IBM PC compatible games that "most companies are attempting to get their MS-DOS products out the door, first". It reported that in the US, MS-DOS comprised 65% of the computer-game market, the Amiga at 10%, and all other computers, including the Macintosh, were below 10% and declining. The Amiga and most others, such as the ST and various MSX2 computers, remained on the market until PC compatibles gained sufficient multimedia capabilities to compete with home computers. With the advent of inexpensive versions of the VGA video card and the Sound Blaster sound card (and its clones), most of the remaining home computers were driven from the market. The market in 1990 was more diverse outside the United States, but MS-DOS and Windows machines nonetheless came to dominate by the end of the decade.

By 1995, other than the Macintosh, almost no new consumer-oriented systems were sold that were not IBM PC clones. Throughout the 1990s Apple transitioned the Macintosh from proprietary expansion interfaces to standards such as IDE, PCI, and USB. In 2006, Apple switched the Macintosh to the Intel x86 architecture, allowing them to optionally boot into Microsoft Windows, while still retaining unique design elements to support Apple's Mac OS X operating system.

In 2008, Sid Meier listed the IBM PC as one of the three most important innovations in the history of video games.

== Systems launched shortly after the IBM PC ==
Shortly after the IBM PC was released, an obvious split appeared between systems that opted to use an x86-compatible processor, and those that chose another architecture. Almost all of the x86 systems provided a version of MS-DOS. The others used many different operating systems, although the Z80-based systems typically offered a version of CP/M. The common usage of MS-DOS unified the x86-based systems, promoting growth of the x86/MS-DOS "ecosystem".

As the non-x86 architectures died off, and x86 systems standardized into fully IBM PC compatible clones, a market filled with dozens of different competing systems was reduced to a near-monoculture of x86-based, IBM PC compatible, MS-DOS systems.

=== x86-based systems (using OEM-specific versions of MS-DOS) ===
Early after the launch of the IBM PC in 1981, there were still dozens of systems that were not IBM PC-compatible, but did use Intel x86 chips. They used Intel 8088, 8086, or 80186 processors, and almost without exception offered an OEM version of MS-DOS (as opposed to the OEM version customized for IBM's use). However, they generally made no attempt to copy the IBM PC's architecture, so these machines had different I/O addresses, a different system bus, different video controllers, and other differences from the original IBM PC. These differences, which were sometimes rather minor, were used to improve upon the IBM PC's design, but as a result of the differences, software that directly manipulated the hardware would not run correctly. In most cases, the x86-based systems that did not use a fully IBM PC compatible design did not sell well enough to attract support from software manufacturers, though a few computer manufacturers arranged for compatible versions of popular applications to be developed and sold specifically for their machines.

Fully IBM PC-compatible clones appeared on the market shortly thereafter, as the advantages of cloning became impossible to ignore. But before that some of the more notable systems that were x86-compatible, but not real clones, were:

- the ACT Apricot by ACT
- the Dulmont Magnum
- the Epson QX-16
- the Seequa Chameleon
- the HP-150 by Hewlett-Packard and the later HP 95LX, HP 100LX, HP 200LX, HP 1000CX, HP OmniGo 700LX, HP OmniGo 100, and HP OmniGo 120.
- the Hyperion by Infotech Cie used its own H-DOS OEM version of MS-DOS and was, for a time, licensed but never manufactured by Commodore, as its first PC compatible.
- the MBC-550 by Sanyo had many differences, including non-interchangeability of diskettes and non-standard ROM location.
- the DG-One by Data General was an early laptop with full 80x25 LCD screen that could boot some generic DOSes but worked best with their OEM version of MS-DOS, and had some hardware incompatibilities (especially in the serial I-O chip) as part of the compromise to reduce power consumption. Later models were more compatible with generic PC clones.
- the DG/10 by Data General had two processors, one an Intel 8086, running a very-modified version of MSDOS (alternatively: CP/M-86) in a patented closely coupled arrangement with Data General's own microECLIPSE (the 8086 "invisibly" calling the microECLIPSE whenever it needed access to some peripherals, such as disks, while the 8086 had control over other peripherals such as the screen).
- the 80186-based Mindset graphics computer
- the Morrow Designs' Morrow Pivot
- the MZ-5500 by Sharp
- the Decision Mate V from NCR Corporation; its version of MS-DOS was called NCR-DOS
- the MikroMikko 2 by Nokia
- the NorthStar Advantage
- the PC-9801 systems from NEC
- the Rainbow 100 from DEC had both an 8088 and Zilog Z80 for Digital Research's CP/M-80 Operating System
- the RM Nimbus by RM plc
- the Tandy 2000 by RadioShack had a Intel 8186
- the Texas Instruments TI Professional
- the Torch Graduate by Torch Computers
- the Tulip System-1 by Tulip
- the Victor 9000 by Sirius Systems Technology
- the :YES by Philips was late on the market, ran DOS Plus and MS-DOS, but by using an 80186 it was incompatible with IBM's PC
- the Z-100 by Zenith with an MS-DOS OEM version named Z-DOS

=== Non-x86-based systems ===
Not all manufacturers immediately switched to the Intel x86 microprocessor family and MS-DOS. A few companies continued releasing systems based on non-Intel architectures. Some of these systems used a 32-bit microprocessor, the most popular being the Motorola 68000. Others continued to use 8-bit microprocessors. Many of these systems were eventually forced out of the market by the onslaught of the IBM PC clones, although their architectures may have had superior capabilities, especially in the area of multimedia.

==== Other non-x86-based systems available at the IBM PC's launch ====
- Apple II and Apple II+
- Commodore PET and CBM series
- Atari 400/800
- Cromemco CS-1
- Intertec's Compustar II VPU Model 20
- Corvus Concept
- Kaypro 10
- Fujitsu Micro 16s
- Micro Decision by Morrow Designs
- MTU-130 by Micro Technology Unlimited
- Xerox 820
- RoadRunner from MicroOffice
- TRS-80 Model II and TRS-80 Model III

== See also ==
- Wintel
- Open standard
- Dominant design
- History of computing hardware (1960s–present)
- Timeline of DOS operating systems
- Comparison of MS-DOS compatible operating systems
- List of computers running CP/M
