= PFU =

PFU may refer to:

- PFU Limited, a Japanese information technology company
- Plaque-forming unit, a measure used in virology
- Peoples' Friendship University of Russia, an educational and research institution located in Moscownonaligned countries
- Pfu DNA polymerase, an enzyme
- PFU, the native name of the Norwegian Press Complaints Commission
