= Seen (series) =

Digital interview series

SEEN with Nick Barili is a digital interview series created in partnership with the Academy of Motion Picture Arts and Sciences and hosted by Nick Barili. The series highlights the contributions of Latinx creatives to the film industry, exploring their cultural impact, personal journeys, and challenges in Hollywood. Featuring in-depth conversations with icons such as Eva Longoria, John Leguizamo, and Edward James Olmos, the series aims to inspire dialogue about representation and inclusion in cinema. In 2022, SEEN was a recipient of a Clio Award bronze medal in the "Social Good" category.

== Concept and development ==
Launched in 2022, SEEN was conceived as part of the Academy's ongoing efforts to amplify diverse voices. Nick Barili, an award-winning journalist and filmmaker, served as the creator, executive producer, and host. The series provides a platform for Latinx artists to share their stories while addressing systemic issues and the importance of representation in the film industry.

Barili told the Academy: "The Latin community is one in four moviegoers, yet we're four percent of the movie roles out there right now. It's crazy to think that [there are] 60 million Latinos living in the States, but we're really not seeing ourselves represented. I'm a first-generation immigrant. I came to the U.S. with my mom when I was eight, and a lot of the times when I turned on the TV, I never saw myself represented. Luckily, every two, three, four years, I would get a movie like La Bamba or Stand and Deliver or Mi Familia or Selena, [and] I felt like I got to see myself and see my culture in some way."

=== Episodes ===
Each episode is an intimate, long-form interview filmed in meaningful locations that connect the guests to their personal and professional journeys.

==== Notable episodes ====
- Eva Longoria Eva Longoria revisited California State University, Northridge (CSUN), where she earned her master's degree in Chicano Studies while simultaneously filming Desperate Housewives. Eva shares with Nick Barili: "This place was probably the place I grew most in my life… I was exhausted the whole time I was here," she laughs. "I did night school. I would finish filming [Desperate Housewives] and come here 7 to 10 at night, and then, go home and do it all again. Be on set at 5:00 a.m. It fills my heart with my Mexican pride." In this episode, she reflects on her academic journey and how her studies influenced her work as a producer, director, and activist. Longoria discusses the importance of using her platform to uplift underrepresented voices and create opportunities for the next generation of Latinx filmmakers.
- John Leguizamo John Leguizamo delves into his groundbreaking one-man shows and their impact on the portrayal of Latinx characters in Hollywood. He candidly discusses the struggles of carving out space for authentic storytelling in an industry resistant to change. Filmed in New York City, the episode captures Leguizamo's passion for theater and his enduring influence as an advocate for Latinx representation. Nick told Deadline: "The conversation with John resonated with me at my core. Not only is his show Freak the first time I truly felt seen, but also, he's broken down walls for our community every step of his career. When Hollywood would only typecast him in stereotypical, one-dimensional roles, he took it upon himself to create, write and perform his own one-man shows that gave Latinos like me a chance to see themselves as three-dimensional characters that we didn't get to see when we turned on the TV. They were complex, funny, courageous, vulnerable, and made me feel proud to be Latino."
- Edward James Olmos Edward James Olmos visits a school participating in Youth Cinema Project, a program he co-founded to teach filmmaking to underserved students. During the episode, Olmos reflects on his roles in iconic films like Stand and Deliver and how his work has been a vehicle for social change. He emphasizes the importance of education and empowering youth through storytelling as tools for community transformation. "To me, trying to understand your life and your culture and your heritage, and the roots that make you the tree that you are – the human being that you are – sharing it so that others can understand… it makes everybody stronger. And that's why I'm a storyteller," Olmos tells Nick Barili in the latest Seen episode.

=== Awards and recognition ===
SEEN with Nick Barili received a Clio Award for its excellence in highlighting underrepresented voices and advancing cultural equity in entertainment. The series has been praised for its thoughtful storytelling and its ability to foster meaningful conversations about diversity in Hollywood.

=== Legacy ===
The series represents a significant step forward in the Academy's efforts to celebrate underrepresented voices in film. Barili's ability to connect with guests and elicit profound insights has solidified his reputation as a thought leader in purpose-driven storytelling.
