= HireVue =

American human resources technology company

Hirevue
- Type: Private
- Industry: Artificial intelligence, human resources
- Founded: 2004; 22 years ago South Jordan, Utah, U.S.
- Founder: Mark Newman
- Headquarters: Sandy, Utah, U.S.
- Key people: Jeremy Friedman (CEO)
- Number of employees: 400 (2023)
- Website: www.hirevue.com

Hirevue is an artificial intelligence (AI) and human resources management company headquartered in Sandy, Utah. Founded in 2004, the company allows its clients to conduct digital interviews during the hiring process, where the job candidate interacts with a computer instead of a human interviewer.

The company has received considerable media coverage related to its use of AI to analyze interviewees' facial and verbal data during the interview process.

== History ==
=== Founding and early history ===
The company was founded by Mark Newman in 2004, then a 20-year-old undergraduate at Westminster College. Newman also served as the company's chief executive officer (CEO). The company is headquartered in Sandy, Utah, near Salt Lake City. An artificial intelligence company, Hirevue has been described as a human resources technology or "human capital management" (HCM) company, and has been noted as a "pioneer in the field." To help facilitate long-distance job interviews, the company originally sent candidates webcams. The company offers its clients the ability to conduct one-way job interviews during a hiring process. Job applicants are prompted the same questions through Hirevue.

By 2012, Hirevue's clients included Nike, Starbucks, Walmart, Geico, and Hasbro, among others. These clients were signed to annual subscription plans with Hirevue. In 2012, Forbes staff writer Susan Adams noted that "the typical Hirevue interview lasts 12 minutes and has just four questions, with about three minutes to answer each question." Interviewees are also allowed to see each question prior to responding; a practice question as well as interview tips are also provided. For Hirevue's clients, the interview setup allowed for recruiters to spend less time on scheduling candidates and more time on evaluating them.

That August, the company acquired CodeEval for an undisclosed sum, allowing Hirevue to add programming challenges when hiring developers. By this time, Hirevue's CEO was David Bradford. Later that same month, the company announced it raised a $17 million Series C round led by Investor Growth Capital; along with an expansion of its debt facility, Hirevue raised a total of $28 million when including what it raised during its B and C rounds.

=== Use of artificial intelligence and company growth ===
In 2013, the company began using artificial intelligence to screen interviewees. Both proprietary voice recognition software and licensed facial recognition software are used by Hirevue's Insights program. The company's Hirevue Insights program scans applicants' verbal and facial gestures and cues, matching them with skills employers seek in given roles. Aside from facial gestures, Hirevue also assesses an interviewees' tone, vocabulary, and "candidate empathy". All of these analyzed data points are then used to generate an "employability" score for a candidate, which is ranked versus other applicants. Hirevue's AI is able to refine its accuracy over time given new data due to machine learning.

By 2013, the company had 140 employees. Noted by TechCrunch to still ship out webcams to job candidates if needed, the company's software was available on desktops, laptops, tablets, and smartphones. That October, Hirevue announced it raised $25 million during its Series D round, led by Sequoia Capital. The company would integrate its products into platforms and websites such as LinkedIn and Salesforce.com. Hirevue stated it facilitated three million interviews in 2015, up from 13,000 five years prior.

By 2017, Kevin Parker was the company's CEO. The company's chief technology officer (CTO) Loren Larsen stated the company experimented with giving candidates limited and unlimited attempts to answer interview questions before moving onto the next, with Hirevue ultimately opting to provide unlimited attempts to candidates.

Several concerns about Hirevue's facial analysis were raised by interview candidates and AI researchers, which led to the company removing its facial analysis function from candidate assessments in early 2020. While the company maintained no bias resulted from its use of such technology, Parker conceded it "wasn't worth the concern" to keep. Later that September, Hirevue integrated with Microsoft Teams, allowing for interviews to be offered on the Teams platform to its user base. In October, Hirevue acquired AllyO, a chatbot technology startup.

In 2022, Anthony Reynolds succeeded Parker as the company's CEO. In May 2023, Hirevue acquired one of its competitors, Modern Hire. On the acquisition, Reynolds stated that both companies "have a fundamental basis or a foundation in science and I/O [industrial-organizational] psychology." At the time, Hirevue had around 700 clients and 400 employees, while Modern Hire had around 450 and 200, respectively. In January 2024, Reynolds stepped down from his position as CEO and was succeeded by Jeremy Friedman.

In March 2026, Hirevue acquired San Francisco-based AI interview automation company Hireguide to expand its conversational hiring technology capabilities. Financial terms of the transaction were not disclosed.

== Reception ==
Hirevue's service has received some criticism from interview candidates and AI researchers, particularly for its analysis of "micro-expressions". Commentary on its perceived drawbacks and potential to incite anxiety in interviewees has also been made. In 2015, Fortune writer Katherine Reynolds Lewis called video interviewing through Hirevue and similar companies a "potentially terrifying innovation." Writing for Business Insider, Kevin Feloni opined that Hirevue's strength is also its "potential weakness", stating "the AI learns from the employee pool hiring managers choose to feed it. It can then be customized to remove certain biases, such as vocal tics, but that is also dependent on human judgment."

In 2019, The Washington Post writer Drew Harwell called Hirevue "a powerful gatekeeper for some of America's most prominent employers," as well as "pervasive in some industries", adding that the company was "reshaping how companies assess their workforce — and how prospective employees prove their worth." Harwell also noted that the company's prominence led to universities making "special efforts to train students on how to look and speak" to generate optimal results.

Meanwhile, companies using Hirevue's service have noted their hiring processes shortening by considerable margins. Bloomberg News' Rebecca Greenfield wrote that "with a video interview, human resources staff members only have to review the answers, and can do so on their own schedule, without having to travel for on-campus recruiting," with all this saving money for companies. CNBC's Tonya Riley wrote that Hirevue and similar companies "boast speed as a key for why more and more recruiters are relying on their services."

Harwell cited Meredith Whittaker, a co-founder of the New York-based research center, the AI Now Institute. Whittaker called Hirevue's AI technology a "profoundly disturbing development", as well as "pseudoscience" and a "license to discriminate."

Hirevue's staff has commented on these concerns. Larsen has said candidates interviewing through the company's service are "getting the same shot regardless of gender, ethnicity, age, employment gaps, or college attended." Larsen also called criticism such as Whittaker's uninformed, stating that "most AI researchers have a limited understanding" of worker psychology and behavior. Hirevue's industrial psychologist Nathan Mondragon has also stated that "No single customer hires solely on the algorithm. I would never recommend that."

In 2026, Hirevue was listed among several AI hiring technology providers being investigated by attorneys over potential violations of the Fair Credit Reporting Act (FCRA) related to AI-based applicant screening and consumer reporting practices.

== Legal challenges ==
In November 2019, the Electronic Privacy Information Center filed a complaint to the Federal Trade Commission alleging that Hirevue's software caused harm to American workers through its collection of biometric data, bias towards those with different genders, races, sexual orientations and "neurological differences", and its failure to meet standards for artificial intelligence systems set by the Organization for Economic Cooperation and Development.

In 2023, a Massachusetts resident filed a lawsuit against CVS Health in federal court alleging that the company utilized Hirevue and Affectiva's software to assign applicants an "employability score", which was partly based on an applicant's "conscientiousness", "responsibility", and "innate sense of integrity and honor". The lawsuit was settled out of court in July 2024.

In March 2025, the American Civil Liberties Union of Colorado filed a complaint to the Colorado Civil Rights Division and the Equal Employment Opportunity Commission alleging that Hirevue's software discriminated against a deaf and Native American employee at Intuit when she applied for a promotion at the company. Hirevue denied the allegations, stating that Intuit had not used the company's AI-based assessment technology in the interview process.

== See also ==
- Artificial empathy
- Artificial intelligence in hiring
