= Lockheed MAC-16 =

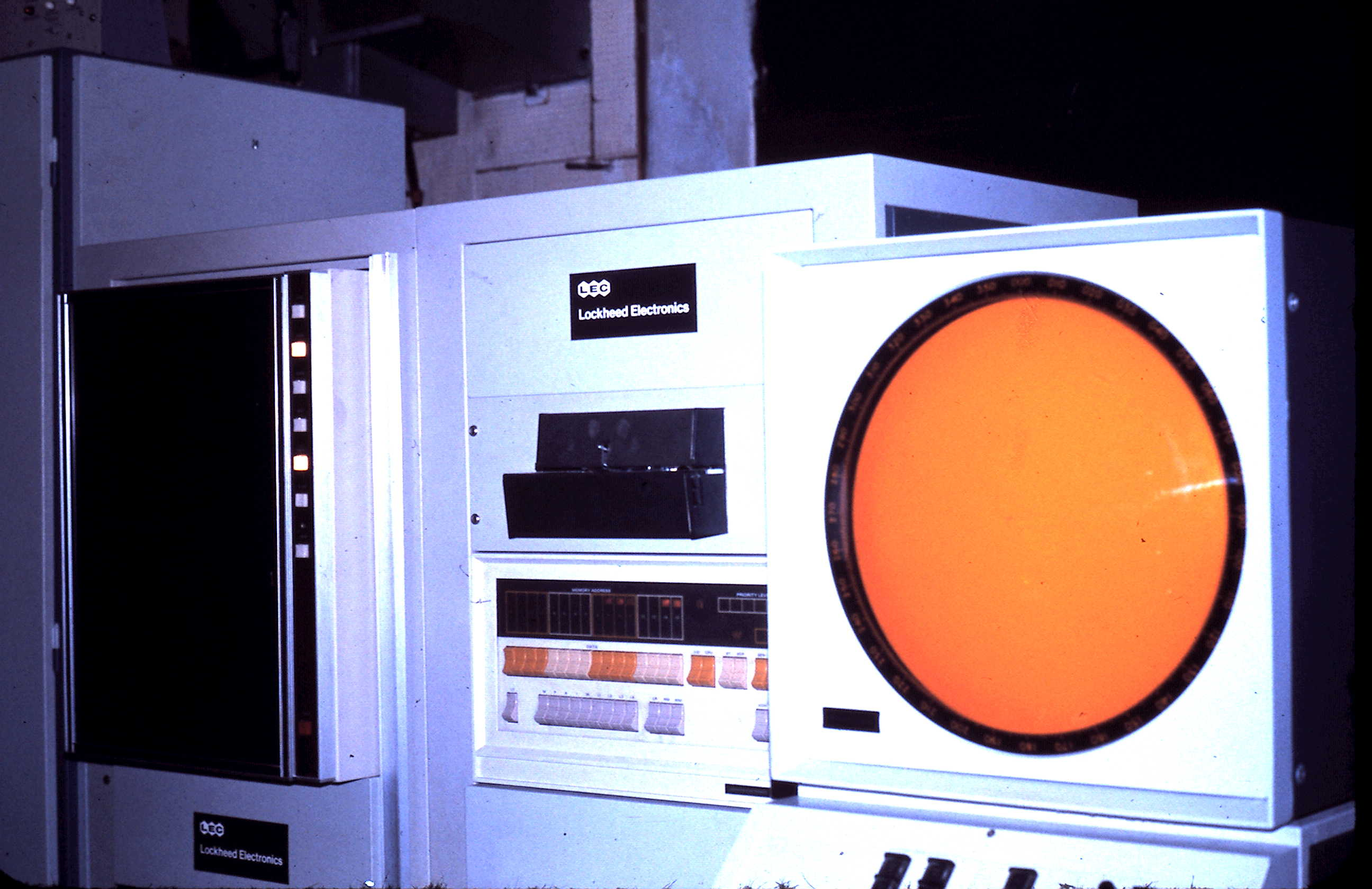
Storage (left), MAC-16 (center), paper tape reader (center top) and Plessy display (right) as part of an ARTS II set-up displayed in Rome.

The MAC-16 (or LEC-16) was a 16-bit minicomputer introduced in 1969 by Lockheed Electronics. One main selling point of the MAC-16 was a dedicated context switching system that completed operations in two machine cycles. Several improved versions were introduced, including the MAC Jr., Sue, and System III, but the company dropped support for all of these in the late 1970s.

The MAC-16 was designed to support various high-performance military and civilian roles, and thus spent a considerable amount of time on guaranteeing high speed context switching to support real-time computing. A switch to and from an interrupt handler took only 2 cycles. The original MAC-16 operated with a 1 μS cycle time using core memory and TTL integrated circuits. Lockheed advertised the machine with the slogan "In by 12:34:45.000000, out by 12:34:45.000002". The system featured 64 interrupt levels, allowing considerable flexibility in software design.

Like any machine based on a 16-bit instruction register, the original MAC-16 was able to address up to 64 kilo-words (kW, 128 kB) of RAM. At the time, RAM was provided in the form of hand-wired core memory, which cost about $1 per word. Most MAC-16 machines thus featured considerably less than 64 kW, and 8 kW systems were common as this was all that was needed to support a Fortran compiler. Third-party memory expansion products were available for about half the cost of the Lockheed parts.

One well-known role for the MAC-16 was Lockheed's winning entry for the Federal Aviation Administration's "ARTS II" air-traffic control system. The original ARTS (Automated Radar Terminal System) was based on Univac mainframe computers, which were tube-based systems of enormous size and cost, far too expensive to be used at smaller airports. ARTS II was introduced to address the needs for smaller airports. Lockheed's entry was based on the MAC-16 and a large display system delivered by Plessey, providing on-screen symbology and altitude data for up to 256 aircraft. Ironically, after Lockheed won the ARTS II contest, Burroughs underbid Lockheed, and the ARTS II was based on Burroughs systems.

MAC-16s were found in numerous other roles, including the control systems for the Fermilab accelerators.
