= IMP-16 =

National Semiconductor IMP-16
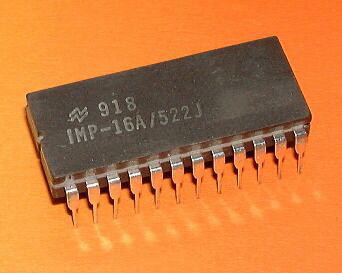
- IMP-16A, one of four RALU chips

General information
- Launched: 1973; 53 years ago
- Common manufacturer: National Semiconductor

Performance
- Max. CPU clock rate: to 715 KHz
- Data width: 16
- Address width: 16

Physical specifications
- Package: five or six 24-pin DIPs

Architecture and classification
- Number of instructions: 43

History
- Successor: PACE

The IMP-16, by National Semiconductor, was the first multi-chip 16-bit microprocessor, released in 1973. It consisted of five PMOS integrated circuits: four identical RALU chips, short for register and ALU, providing the data path, and one CROM, Control and ROM, providing control sequencing and microcode storage. The IMP-16 is a bit-slice processor; each RALU chip provides a 4-bit slice of the register and arithmetic that work in parallel to produce a 16-bit word length.

== Configuration ==
Each RALU chip stores its own 4 bits of the program counter, several registers, the ALU, a 16-word LIFO stack, and status flags. There are four 16-bit accumulators, two of which could be used as index registers. The instruction set architecture was similar to that of the Data General Nova. Like the Nova, the smallest unit of addressable and writable memory is the 16-bit word; byte-level writes are not supported. IMP-16 can address up to 64K words (128K bytes). The chip set can be extended with the CROM II chip (IMP-16A / 522D) that implements 16-bit multiply and divide routines plus byte operations. Byte support is limited to the lower 32K words of memory. The chipset is driven by a 715 kHz four-phase non-overlapping clock with a +5 to -12 voltage swing. An integral part of the architecture is a 16-bit input mux that provided various condition bits from the ALUs such as zero, carry, overflow along with general purpose inputs.

== Applications ==
The microprocessor was used in the IMP-16P microcomputer and Jacquard Systems' J100 but saw little other use. The IMP-16 was later superseded by the PACE and INS8900 single-chip 16-bit microprocessors, which had a similar architecture but were not binary compatible. It was also used in the Aston Martin Lagonda, thanks to National Semiconductor's chairman Peter Sprague being a major shareholder in Aston Martin at the time.

== Example code ==
The following assembler source code is for a subroutine CPYMEM that copies words from one location to another. All instructions in basic instruction set are one word.

 
 
 
1000
1000 8200
1001 A300
1002 4A01
1003 4B01
1004 49FF
1005 22FA
1006 0200

; Copy memory words addressed by AC2 to location addressed
; by AC3 for a number of words contained in AC1.
; AC0 through AC3 equated to 0 through 3
        .=       X*1000
CPYMEM: LD      AC0,0(AC2)      ; Get word to copy @AC2
        ST      AC0,0(AC3)      ; Save word @AC3
        AISZ    AC2,1           ; Bump source pointer
        AISZ    AC3,1           ; Bump dest pointer
        AISZ    AC1,-1          ; Decrement word count, skip if 0
        JMP     CPYMEM          ; else loop for all words
        RTS     0               ; Return

IMP-16 registers
^{1}_{5}	^{1}_{4}	^{1}_{3}	^{1}_{2}	^{1}_{1}	^{1}_{0}	^{0}_{9}	^{0}_{8}	^{0}_{7}	^{0}_{6}	^{0}_{5}	^{0}_{4}	^{0}_{3}	^{0}_{2}	^{0}_{1}	^{0}_{0}	(bit position)
Main registers
AC0																Accumulator
AC1																Accumulator
AC2																Acc/Base
AC3																Acc/Base
Program counter
PC																Program Counter
Stack
STK																(16 entries)
Status Flags Register (FR)
L	OV	CY	GF	GF	GF	GF	GF	GF	GF	GF	GF	GF	GF	GF	GF	Status
