= Ithaca InterSystems =

American computer company

Ithaca InterSystems, Inc.
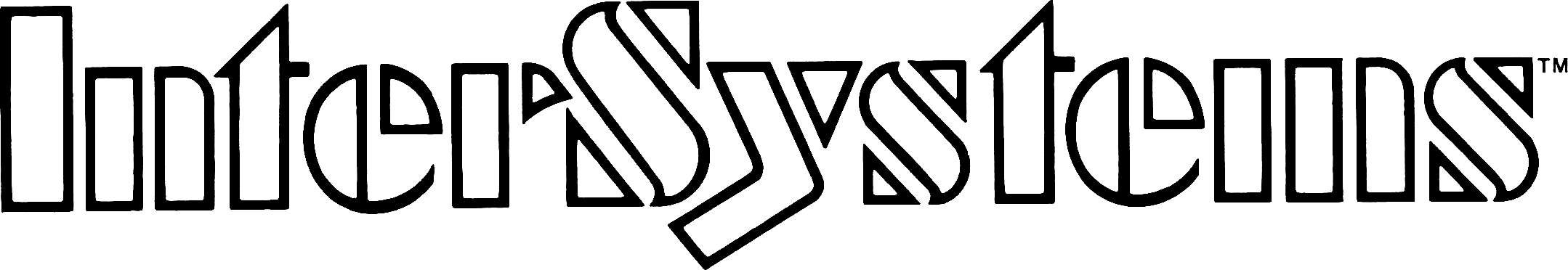
- Formerly: Ithaca Audio
- Company type: Private
- Industry: Computer
- Founded: April 1978; 48 years ago in Ithaca, New York
- Founder: Steven Edelman
- Defunct: 1986; 40 years ago
- Fate: Dissolution
- Number of employees: 90 (1982, peak)

Ithaca InterSystems, Inc., originally Ithaca Audio and often shortened to InterSystems, was an American computer company active in the 1970s and 1980s and based in Ithaca, New York. The company both manufactured microcomputers and peripherals and developed its own software.

== History ==
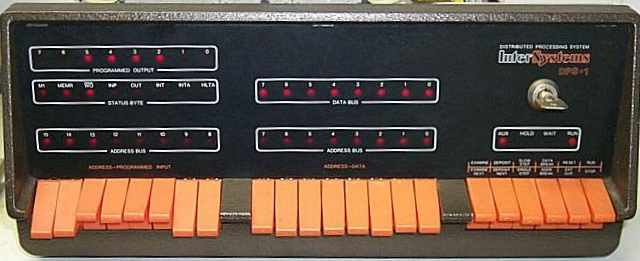
Front view of Ithaca InterSystems' DPS-1. This was one of the last S-100 computers to have front panel switches, like the original Altair 8800.

Ithaca InterSystems was founded in Ithaca, New York, in March 1977 and formally incorporated in April 1978. Steven Edelman, the company's principal founder, incorporated it with two of his friends. For the first two years of its existence, the company was named Ithaca Audio—an homage to Edelman's original business of reselling Hi-Fi audio gear to his fellow peers at his alma mater of Cornell University in the early 1970s. After graduating from Cornell University with a degree in electrical engineering in 1976, he briefly worked as an engineer at NCR Corporation, working at the latter company's microcomputer research and development laboratory before quitting, citing disagreement with his managers. Edelmen and two others founded InterSystems with $6,000 in startup capital; its initial headquarters was a small rented space in Sheldon Court, within the Collegetown neighborhood adjacent to Cornell University's main campus. In the summer of 1979, the company leased a 8,300-square-foot building off Hanshaw Road, quickly filling it with manufacturing equipment. By the end of 1979, InterSystems had 34 full-time employees on its payroll.

InterSystems' first complete computer system was the DPS-1, a Z80-based, S-100 bus microcomputer, released in 1979. The computer sold very well, the company soon earning big-name customers such as Bank of America, CBS, General Electric, Jet Propulsion Laboratory, and NASA. Its success threatened to overload the company's sole manufacturing facility, and in mid-1980 the company began eyeing real estate elsewhere in the city before getting a grant from the local government to expand their presence on Hanshaw Road. The year 1981 saw the company's workforce grow to 75 employees.

Struggling with cash flow in 1980, InterSystems was able to raise venture capital in multiple rounds, with Olivetti S.p.A. of Italy and Oak Management of Connecticut. However, Edelman soon found himself fighting with management in these companies, who demanded an increasingly controlling stake in InterSystems. He left the company on amicable terms in early 1981, taking a sabbatical for the next three years before founding SuperMac Technology, a hardware vendor for Macintosh computers, in 1984. Meanwhile, immediately following his leave, InterSystems began developing a larger minicomputer, eventually released as the DPS-8000 in September 1981. The DPS-8000 was based on Zilog's 16-bit Z8002 processor and used the Coherent Unix-like operating system from the Mark Williams Company. In June 1982, InterSystems laid off 20 of their 90 employees, or 22 percent of the total workforce, management citing effects of the early 1980s recession.

The year 1983 started off promising for InterSystems, the company receiving $1 million in their latest round of venture capital from Olivetti and Oak Management in February 1983. The company's management and engineering team also moved from Hanshaw Road to the fourth and fifth floor of 200 East Buffalo Street; the Hanshaw Road building was kept around as a manufacturing facility. The company had recently released the Graphos graphical terminal in late 1982, which was a commercial success for the company. In August 1983, InterSystems introduced the Encore workstation, intended for scientific research, industrial process control, and business accounting.

As with many other companies manufacturing computers based on the S-100 bus, it soon found itself struggling to compete against the rising domination of the IBM Personal Computer and its many clones in the mid-1980s. By 1986, InterSystems had folded. Reflecting on the end of his first company, Edelman said in 1989: "It's sad. Recently the last S-100 company, Cromemco, took down the sign in front of its building. It's the passing of an era. IMSAI, Vector Graphic, Godbout, MITS—all gone now."
