= PFU Limited =

Japanese information technology company

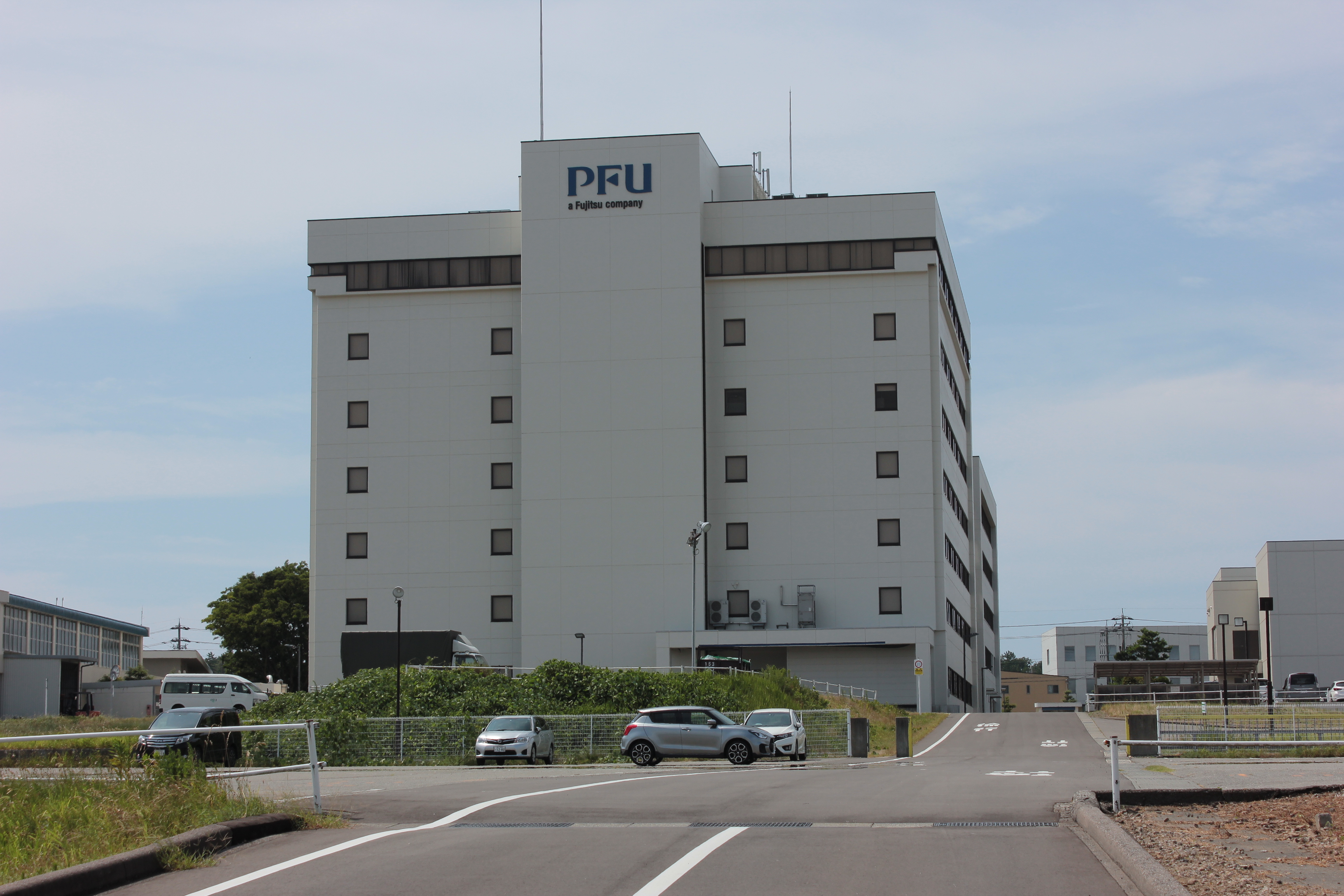
- PFU Headquarters
- Native name: 株式会社PFU
- Company type: Subsidiary
- Industry: Information Technology
- Founded: 1960; 66 years ago as Unoke Electronic Industrial
- Headquarters: Kahoku, Ishikawa, Japan
- Revenue: ¥135,200 million (2018)
- Owner: Ricoh (100%)
- Members: 4,403 (2019)

PFU Limited (株式会社PFU, Kabushiki gaisha Pī Efu Yū) is a Japanese information technology company wholly owned by Ricoh, formed by the merger of Panafacom and USAC Electronic Industrial in 1987. As of 2019, it focuses on computing and IT consulting, with products including image scanners, embedded computers and the Happy Hacking Keyboard. It owns a volleyball team formed in 1979 at USAC Electronic Industrial, the PFU BlueCats.

== History ==
Panafacom was a conglomerate of three Japanese companies, formed by Fujitsu, Fuji Electric and the Matsushita Group on July 2, 1973. The company provided OEM manufacturing for Fujitsu and Matsushita, and developed one of the first commercially available 16-bit microprocessors, the MN1610.

Unoke Electronic Industrial (合名会社ウノケ電子工業, Gōmei gaisha Unoke Denshi Kōgyō) was a minicomputer manufacturer founded in Unoke, Ishikawa on November 1, 1960. Uchida Yoko, an office equipment trading company, became a distributor of its minicomputers to enter the computer business. Unoke Electronic Industrial was renamed to USAC Electronic Industrial (ユーザック電子工業株式会社, Yūzakku Denshi Kōgyō Kabushiki kaisha) in 1969.

Fujitsu, Uchida Yoko and USAC Electronic Industrial began a partnership in 1971. Panafacom merged with USAC Electronic Industrial to create PFU in 1987. PFU became a wholly owned subsidiary of Fujitsu in 2010.

In April 2022, it was announced that 80% of PFU's shares had been acquired by Ricoh.

In March 2025, Ricoh acquired the remaining 20% of the common shares of PFU held by Fujitsu, making it a wholly owned subsidiary of Ricoh.

== Products ==
=== Image scanner ===
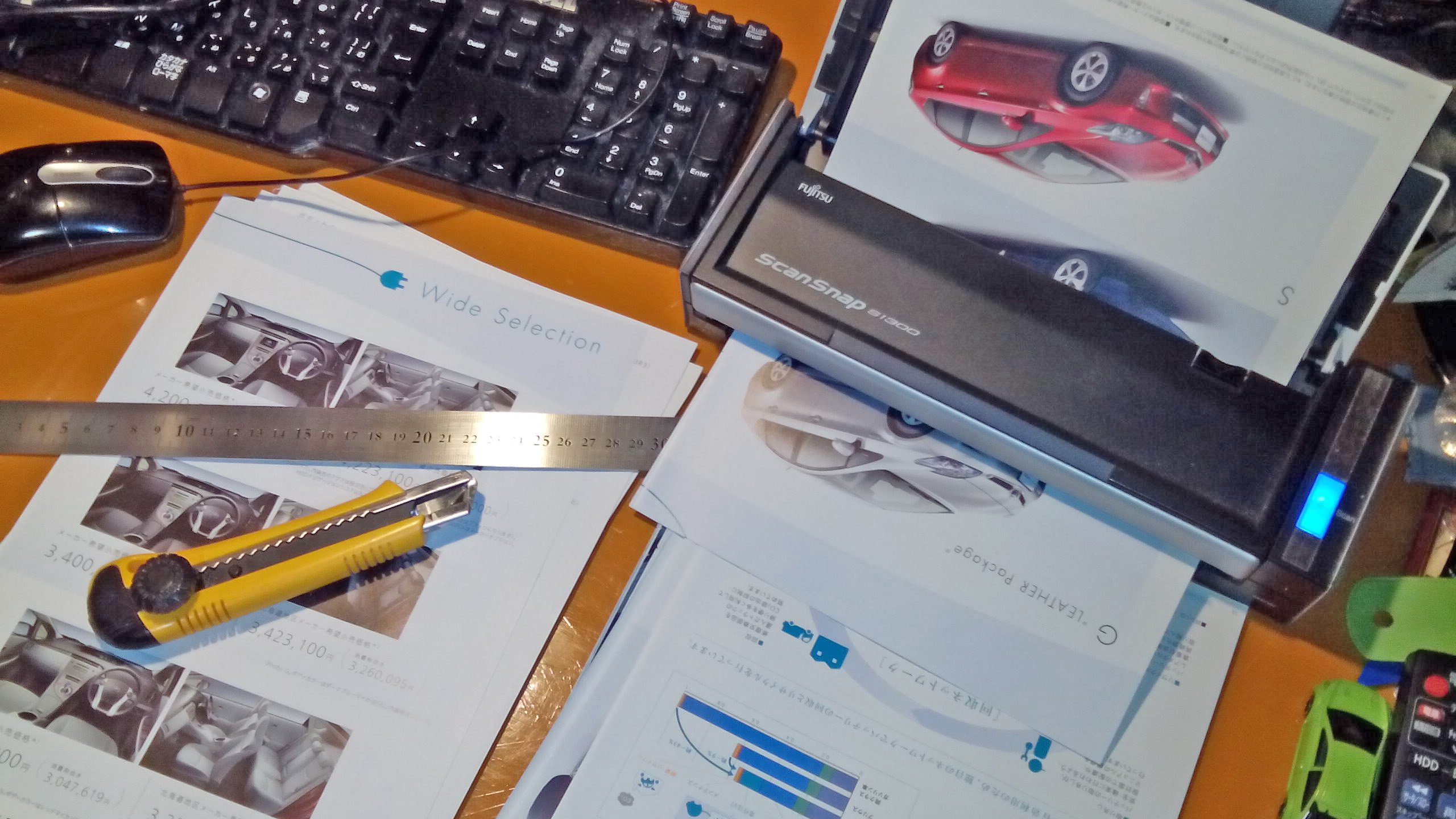
ScanSnap S1300

Fujitsu spun off image scanner product lines to PFU in 2001. PFU (under Fujitsu brand) has more than 50% share of the worldwide enterprise image scanner market.

=== Keyboard ===
The Happy Hacking Keyboard is a small computer keyboard codeveloped with Japanese computer engineer Eiti Wada, manufactured by Fujitsu Takamisawa Component Limited, and debut in 1996. It was expensive to enter the American OEM market, so PFU released the Happy Hacking Keyboard Lite which was manufactured by Chicony Electronics. It failed to sell in the United States, but was successful in Japan. In 2003, Fujitsu Takamisawa Component would stop production of keyboards in Japan, so PFU co-developed the Happy Hacking Keyboard Professional with Topre Corporation. The series has shipped 400,000 units as of 2015.

=== Minicomputer ===
Panafacom had developed minicomputers for Fujitsu since 1973. When the company was founded, 70% of staff were engineers who developed minicomputers at Fujitsu. USAC Electronic Industrial had also developed minicomputers for Uchida Yoko and Fujitsu.

=== Microcomputer ===
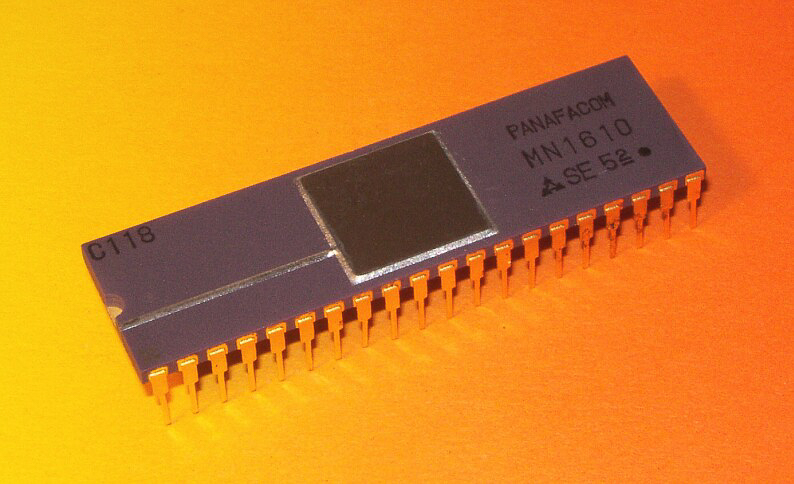
Panafacom MN1610

In April 1975, Panafacom announced the 16-bit single-chip microprocessor, the Panafacom L-16A (MN1610).

NEC released the TK-80 microcomputer evaluation kit in 1976, and it became popular among computer enthusiasts and hobbyists in Japan. Panafacom also released the Panafacom Lkit-16 in March 1977 to popularize the MN1610.

The Panafacom C-15 is an industrial personal computer using the MN1610 processor, announced in Japan in May 1978. It cost ¥700,000 (equivalent to ¥1,160,580 in 2024) with 16 KB of RAM, flat keyboard, monochrome display and cassette tape recorder.

The Panafacom C-180 is an office personal computer announced in 1980. It has two MN1610A processors clocked at 4 MHz, 124 KB of RAM, 80×24 text, two 320 KB 5 ^{1}/_{4} inch floppy drives and Japanese keyboard. Its price was ¥1,650,000 (equivalent to ¥2,445,078 in 2024) At first, it was provided only to OEMs. Hoya Glass purchased 1,500 of C-180 from Fujitsu to introduce computer terminals at its eyeglass stores. In October 1981, Fujitsu sold it as the FACOM 9450, Matsushita sold it as the C-18, and Panafacom began selling it. Its price was started at ¥790,000 (equivalent to ¥1,115,753 in 2024) for a configuration with 128 KB of RAM, two 640 KB 5 ^{1}/_{4} inch floppy drives, monochrome display and keyboard. While Panafacom marketed it as a standalone system, Fujitsu marketed it as a network workstation. Getting popular of the IBM 5550 which had a similar concept, the FACOM 9450 also got popular in the corporate sector.

The Panafacom C-280 was announced in 1983. It has two MN1613 processors, 384 KB of RAM and 640×480 pixel resolution. Fujitsu sold it as the FACOM 9450II, Matsushita sold it as the Operate 7000, and Honeywell Japan sold it as the DPS Junior.

The Panafacom C-380 was announced in 1985. It has an MN1617 processor, a 68000 as a display controller, an HD63484 CRTC, 1 MB of RAM and 960×720 pixel resolution. Fujitsu sold it as the FACOM 9450Σ, and Matsushita sold it as the Operate 8000.

By 1988, Fujitsu sold 250,000 units of the FACOM 9450 series, and it was followed by the FMR series.
