= Panafacom =

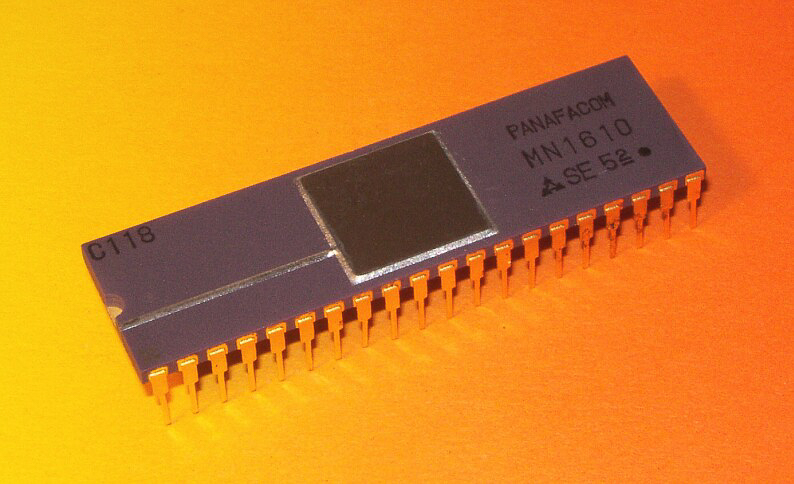
Panafacom MN1610

Panafacom was a Japanese microprocessor design firm established on 2 July 1973 by a consortium of companies that included Fujitsu, Fuji Electric and Matsushita (Panasonic). The company was formed to design and manufacture the MN1610, a 16-bit microprocessor. The MN1610 was released in April 1975, becoming one of the world's first single-chip 16-bit microprocessors.

The design saw relatively little use and remains largely unknown in the computer field. In 1987, Panafacom was merged with USAC Electronic Industrial to form today's PFU Limited.
