= British Medical Bulletin =

- Discipline: Medicine
- Language: English
- Edited by: Nicola Maffulli

Publication details
- History: Since 1943
- Publisher: Oxford University Press
- Frequency: Quarterly
- Impact factor: 5.4 (2024)

Standard abbreviations
- ISO 4: Br. Med. Bull.

Indexing
- CODEN: BMBUAQ
- ISSN: 0007-1420 (print); 1471-8391 (web)
- OCLC no.: 855519

Links
- Journal homepage; Online access; Online archive

The British Medical Bulletin is a quarterly peer-reviewed medical journal that publishes review articles on a wide variety of medical subjects. The journal was established in 1943 and is published by Oxford University Press. The editor-in-chief is Nicola Maffulli (Queen Mary University of London). According to the Journal Citation Reports, the journal has a 2024 impact factor of 5.4. The journal focuses on authoritative, invited reviews that interpret “growing points” in medicine and help clinicians incorporate both new evidence and new conceptual approaches into practice. The journal does not accept unsolicited submissions and all its published reviews are commissioned by the editorial board.

== Notable articles ==
As of November 2025, the journal's website listed the following most-read articles:

- Howcroft, Alastair; Bennett-Weston, Amber; Khan, Ahmad; Griffiths, Joseff; Gay, Simon; Howick, Jeremy (22 September 2025). "AI chatbots versus human healthcare professionals: a systematic review and meta-analysis of empathy in patient care". British Medical Bulletin. 156 (1) ldaf017. doi:10.1093/bmb/ldaf017. PMC 12536877. PMID 41115171.
- Eaton, Georgette (11 December 2023). "Addressing the challenges facing the paramedic profession in the United Kingdom". British Medical Bulletin. 148 (1): 70–78. doi:10.1093/bmb/ldad024. PMC 10724452. PMID 37681285.
- Billings, Jo; Nicholls, Helen (22 September 2025). "PTSD and complex PTSD, current treatments and debates: a review of reviews". British Medical Bulletin. 156 (1) ldaf015. doi:10.1093/bmb/ldaf015. PMC 12466117. PMID 41004137.
- Spriggs, Merle (5 April 2023). "Children and bioethics: clarifying consent and assent in medical and research settings". British Medical Bulletin. 145 (1): 110–119. doi:10.1093/bmb/ldac038. PMC 10075240. PMID 36723953.
- Lyman, Monty; McCutcheon, Robert A (22 September 2025). "Antipsychotic drugs at 75: the past, present, and future of psychosis management". British Medical Bulletin. 156 (1) ldaf016. doi:10.1093/bmb/ldaf016. PMC 12499752. PMID 41052274.

== History ==
The journal was conceived in 1940 through collaboration between the British Medical Journal and the Ministry of Information, and it grew from the British Medical Information Service, which had been set up to counter wartime misinformation about British medicine and science. It began in 1943, created by the British Council from an earlier wartime project to share British medical research with other countries. From the mid-1940s onwards, each issue increasingly focused on a single theme, with specially commissioned review articles by authoritative experts. The journal has an extensive online archive stretching back to its inaugural 1943 issue.
