= Artificial intelligence in hiring =

AI application in work environments

Artificial intelligence (AI) can be used to automate aspects of the job recruitment process. Advances in AI, such as the advent of machine learning and the growth of big data, enable AI to be utilized to recruit, screen, and predict the success of applicants. Proponents of AI in hiring claim it reduces bias, assists with finding qualified candidates, and frees up human resource (HR) workers' time for other tasks, while opponents worry that AI perpetuates inequalities in the workplace and will eliminate jobs. Despite potential benefits, the ethical implications of AI in hiring remain a subject of debate, with concerns about algorithmic transparency, accountability, and the need for ongoing oversight to ensure fair and unbiased decision-making throughout the recruitment process.

== Background ==
It is common for companies to use AI to automate aspects of their hiring process, especially the hospitality, finance, and tech industries.

In 2022, according to research by the Society for Human Resource Management (SHRM), nearly 25% of organizations reported using automation or AI to support HR-related activities, including recruitment and hiring. At that time, the use of AI for recruitment was related to an organization's size: 16% of employers with less than 100 workers used AI compared to 42% of employers with 5,000 or more workers. Of those who used AI, over two in three HR professionals said the time it took to fill open positions was somewhat (53%) or much better (16%) due to their use of AI.

By 2024, 35%–45% of companies were utilizing AI in their recruitment processes.

According to 2025 World Economic Forum data, nearly 90% of companies used AI tools in employee hiring.

== Uses ==
=== Recruitment ===
Recruitment involves the identification of potential applicants and the marketing of available positions. AI is commonly utilized in the recruitment process because it can help boost the number of qualified applicants for positions.

Companies are able to use AI to generate job advertisements and then target their marketing to applicants who are likely to fit a position. This often involves the use of social media sites' advertising tools, which rely on AI. For example, Facebook allows advertisers to target ads based on demographics, location, interests, behavior, and connections. Facebook also allows companies to target a "look-a-like" audience, where the company supplies Facebook with a data set, typically the company's current employees, and Facebook will target the ad to profiles similar to the profiles in the data set. In 2018, a study commissioned by Facebook found that one in four people in the U.S. searched for or found a job using Facebook.

Additionally, job sites like Indeed, Glassdoor, and ZipRecruiter target job listings to applicants with certain characteristics employers are looking for. Targeted advertising has many advantages for companies trying to recruit, such as being a more efficient use of resources, reaching a desired audience, and boosting qualified applicants. This has helped make it a mainstay in modern hiring.

Who receives a targeted ad can be controversial. In hiring, the implications of targeted ads have to do with who is able to find and then apply for a position. Most targeted ad algorithms are proprietary information. Some platforms, like Facebook and Google, allow users to see why they were shown a specific ad, but users who do not receive the ad likely never know of its existence and have no way of knowing why they were not shown the ad.

In 2018, the American Civil Liberties Union filed a complaint to the Equal Employment Opportunity Commission alleging that Facebook allowed gender-biased job ads that violated federal and state discrimination laws. In 2019, Facebook disabled the explicit targeting based on gender, age, and zip code for some ad categories, including employment.

=== Screeners ===
Screeners are tests that allow companies to sift through a large applicant pool and extract applicants that have desirable features.

The specific factors used to screen applicants is a concern to ethicists and civil rights activists. A screener that favors people who have similar characteristics to those already employed at a company may perpetuate inequalities. For example, if a company that is predominantly white and male uses its employees' data to train its screener, it may accidentally create a screening process that favors white, male applicants.

The automation of screeners has the potential to reduce or replicate human biases from training materials based on race, gender, age, disability, and other characteristics. Human biases against applicants with African American sounding names have been shown in multiple studies. An AI screener has the potential to limit human bias and error in the hiring process, allowing more minority applicants to be successful.

From 2014–2018, Amazon used a resume-scanning AI tool that was trained on previously recruited candidates’ credentials to rank applicants. However, Amazon engineers discovered that the tool systematically downgraded resumes from female candidates.

According to research by SHRM, in 2022, only two in five employers that used AI recruitment tools from a vendor said the vendor was "very transparent about the steps taken to ensure the tools protect against bias".

AI recruitment tools are also capable of forming their own biases. A 2026 study from Princeton University and the University of Chicago found that AI tools formed group-based biases during hiring tasks even when trained on neutral data. Also, the tools were more likely to form new biases than humans who did the same task.

=== Interviews ===
Chatbots were one of the first applications of AI and are commonly used in the hiring process. Interviewees interact with chatbots to answer interview questions, and an analysis of their responses can be generated by AI.

Another way AI is used is via asynchronous video interviews (AVIs), in which employers send text-based questions electronically and candidates record their responses using a webcam.

HireVue has created technology that analyzes interviewees' responses and gestures during recorded video interviews. Over 12 million interviewees have been screened by the more than 700 companies that utilize the service.

== Controversies ==
AI in hiring confers many benefits, but it also has some challenges that have concerned experts.

=== Biases ===
AI is only as good as the data it is using. Biases can inadvertently be baked into the data used in AI. Often, companies will use data from their employees to decide which people to recruit or hire. This can perpetuate bias and lead to more homogenous workforces.

Facebook Ads was an example of a platform that created such controversy for allowing business owners to specify what type of employee they were looking for. For example, job advertisements for nursing and teaching could be set such that only women of a specific age group would see the advertisements. Facebook Ads has since then removed this function from its platform, citing the potential problems with the function in perpetuating biases and stereotypes against minorities.

The growing use of AI-enabled hiring systems has become an important component of modern talent hiring, particularly through social networks such as LinkedIn and Facebook. However, data overflow embedded in the hiring systems, based on Natural Language Processing (NLP) methods, may result in unconscious gender bias. Utilizing data driven methods may mitigate some bias generated from these systems.

=== Data issues ===
It can also be hard to quantify what makes a good employee. This poses a challenge for training AI to predict which employees will be best. Commonly used metrics like performance reviews can be subjective and have been shown to favor white employees over black employees and men over women.

Another challenge is the limited amount of available data. Employers only collect certain details about candidates during the initial stages of the hiring process. This requires AI to make determinations about candidates with very limited information to go off of. Additionally, many employers do not hire employees frequently and so have limited firm specific data to go off. To combat this, many firms will use algorithms and data from other firms in their industry.

AI's reliance on applicant and current employees' personal data raises privacy issues. These issues effect both applicants and current employees, but also may have implications for third parties who are linked through social media to applicants or current employees. For example, a sweep of someone's social media will also show their friends and people they have tagged in photos or posts.

== AI and the future of hiring ==
AI along with other technological advances, such as improvements in robotics have placed 47% of jobs at risk of being eliminated in the future. In 2016, the founder of the World Economic Forum, Klaus Schwab, called AI and related technology the "Fourth Industrial Revolution". Other scholars claim that AI has already led to significant job loss for unskilled labor and that it will eliminate middle- and high-skill jobs in the future. This position is based around the idea that AI is not yet a technology of general use and that any potential Fourth Industrial Revolution has not fully occurred.

According to some scholars, however, the transformative impact of AI on labor has been overstated. The "no-real-change" theory holds that an IT revolution has already occurred, but that the benefits of implementing new technologies does not outweigh the costs associated with adopting them. This theory claims that the result of the IT revolution is thus much less impactful than had originally been forecasted.

A third theory holds that the effect of AI and other technological advances is too complicated to yet be understood. This theory is centered around the idea that while AI will likely eliminate jobs in the short term, it will also likely increase the demand for other jobs. The question then becomes will the new jobs be accessible to people and will they emerge near when jobs are eliminated.

== AI use in hiring for candidates ==
Job seekers now commonly encounter AI-driven tools at multiple stages, including automated resume parsing, video interview analysis, chatbots for frequently asked questions, and real‑time application updates. Some candidates also employ AI career agents, designed to optimize job searches, tailor applications, and interface with hiring teams.

A 2025 Australian study found that AI-driven video interviews exhibited transcription error rates of up to 22% for non‑native speakers and those with speech-related disabilities, raising concerns of discrimination. A 2017 study in the Journal of Sociology found persistent gender and racial disparities in AI screening tools, even when fairness interventions are applied.

Industry observers describe a growing "AI arms race" in recruitment, where both employers and candidates increasingly rely on automated agents. Employers use recruiting systems to source and filter applicants, while candidates deploy AI agents to prepare and submit applications. AI is also being used on both sides of the interview process. Candidates can use AI tools to rehearse answers to common questions or mirror a specific company's culture for AVIs. For synchronous (live conversation) interviews, there are also AI tools that work in real time. Conversely, employers can use video interview platforms with built-in behavior or language analysis.

== Regulations ==
In the United States, there are no federal laws banning AI in hiring. However, individual states have proposed or enacted laws to regulate and/or penalize the use of AI during the hiring process, escpecially when it leads to discrimination, lacks transparency, or operates without human oversight.

The Artificial Intelligence Video Interview Act, effective in Illinois since 2020, regulates the use of AI to analyze and evaluate job applicants' video interviews. This law requires employers to follow guidelines to avoid any issues regarding using AI in the hiring process.

In California, effective October 1, 2025, employers must comply with new FEHA regulations about discrimination resulting from the use of AI and automated decision systems during the employment process.

In May 2026, Connecticut enacted a law that restricts employers' use of AI-powered tools in employment decisions and requires employers to provide employees notice before AI-related reductions in the workforce occur.
