= One-way interview =

Type of automated job interview

One-way interview, also known as asynchronous interview, pre recorded interview, virtual interview or digital interview, enables prospective employers to conduct online video interviews in an automated fashion. The interviews are conducted via websites or internet-enabled devices which use digital interviewing applications.

One-way interviewing is becoming a standard method for first round of screening. It utilizes software to equip hiring personnel to interview candidates who are short of time and could not do a traditional face-to-face interview because of large number of applications. One-way interviewing is also used for candidates that align with a prospective position that may be a full or part-time remote work opportunity.

Interview candidates that are used to traditional face-to-face interviews may find one-way interviewing unusual due to the lack of verbal and non-verbal feedback during the one-way interview process.

Digital interviews are also sometimes conducted as simulated face-to-face interviews, with AI-driven avatars and chatbots replacing the interviewer.

== Interview process ==
The interviewer creates questions in text or audio format, records their interview questions, or prepares sample scenarios/coding challenges for the online interview. The interviewer invites candidates for the online interview via email. The candidate opens the link to the online interview in a web browser or mobile application and then records responses. The candidate reads and then answers each question using a webcam, mobile phone camera, or other device that records audio and video. The interviewers reviews the answers and grades candidates. The interviewers can also share the responses with hiring managers and other team members for a more comprehensive evaluation. Finally, the interviewer invites the selected candidates for the face-to-face interview.

== Traditional interviews and one-way interviewing ==
Traditional interviews continue to be the top choice of many individuals, but many employers are moving to video interview platforms. As the prevalence of remote work positions, technology, and telecommuting continue to increase/improve, virtual interviews are becoming a more acceptable method for identifying ideal hires.

== Criticism ==
Candidates have criticized one-way interviews as being impersonal and lacking the value of a two-way conversation. Some also claim one-way interviews can be used to illegally discriminate against candidates. Privacy concerns are also prevalent, with one-way interview software providers advertising AI analysis.

Simulated two-way interviews, where the "interviewer" is replaced by an AI chatbot, run the risk of the conversation going awry due to inappropriate conversation or simple bugs by the simulation.
