= Firewood =

Wood used for fires

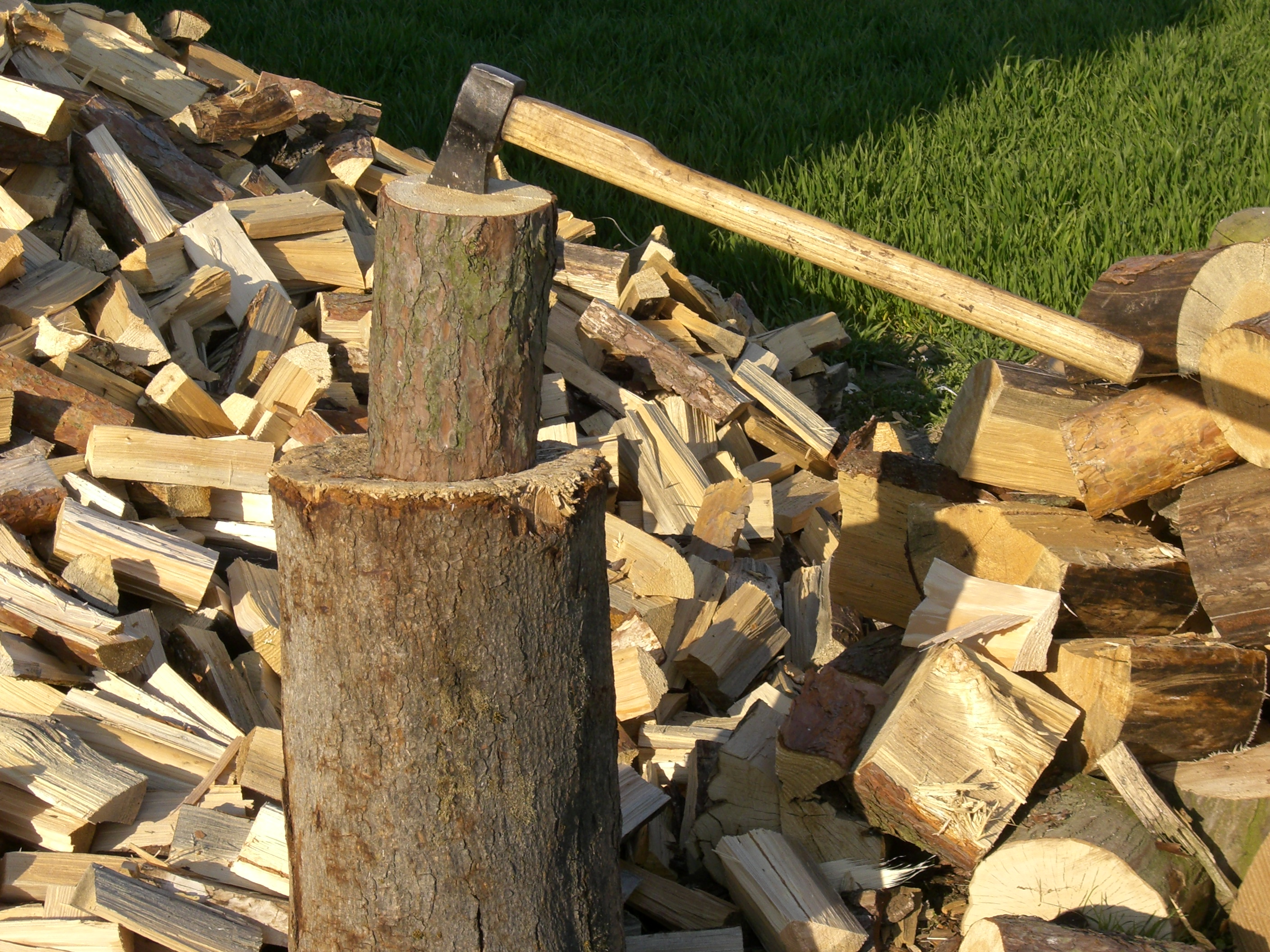
Stack of split firewood and a splitting maul, Czech Republic

Firewood is any wooden material that can be used for fuel. The term usually refers to wood fuel that is not industrially processed, such as wood pellets, and instead takes the form of a recognizable log or branch. Firewood can be heat-treated and seasoned (dry) or unseasoned (fresh/wet). Two classes of firewood exist, which are either hardwood or softwood, depending on the species of tree that was cut.

Bucking, splitting, and stacking logs for firewood in Kõrvemaa, Estonia

Firewood is a renewable resource, although demand for this fuel can quickly outpace its ability to regenerate on a local or regional level. Good forestry practices and efficiency advances in devices that burn firewood can improve local wood supplies.

Smoke from burning wood can cause respiratory issues and other diseases. Transporting firewood long distances can also spread plant pests, diseases, and invasive species.

== History ==
Stacks of firewood in Helsinki in 1941

For most of human history, firewood was the main fuel, until the use of coal spread during the Industrial Revolution. As such, access to firewood was a valued resource, with wood botes, or the right to gather firewood, being a significant aspect of many medieval leases. As late as 19th century America, Henry David Thoreau considered that it was "remarkable what a value is still put upon wood even in this age and this country...the prince and the peasant, the scholar and the savage, equally require still a few sticks from the forest to warm them and cook their food".

== Harvesting ==
Harvesting or collecting firewood varies by region and culture. Some cultures designate specific areas for firewood collection, while others rotate collection areas to allow environmental rebound. Collection can be a group or an individual activity, and tools and methods for harvesting firewood vary by region.

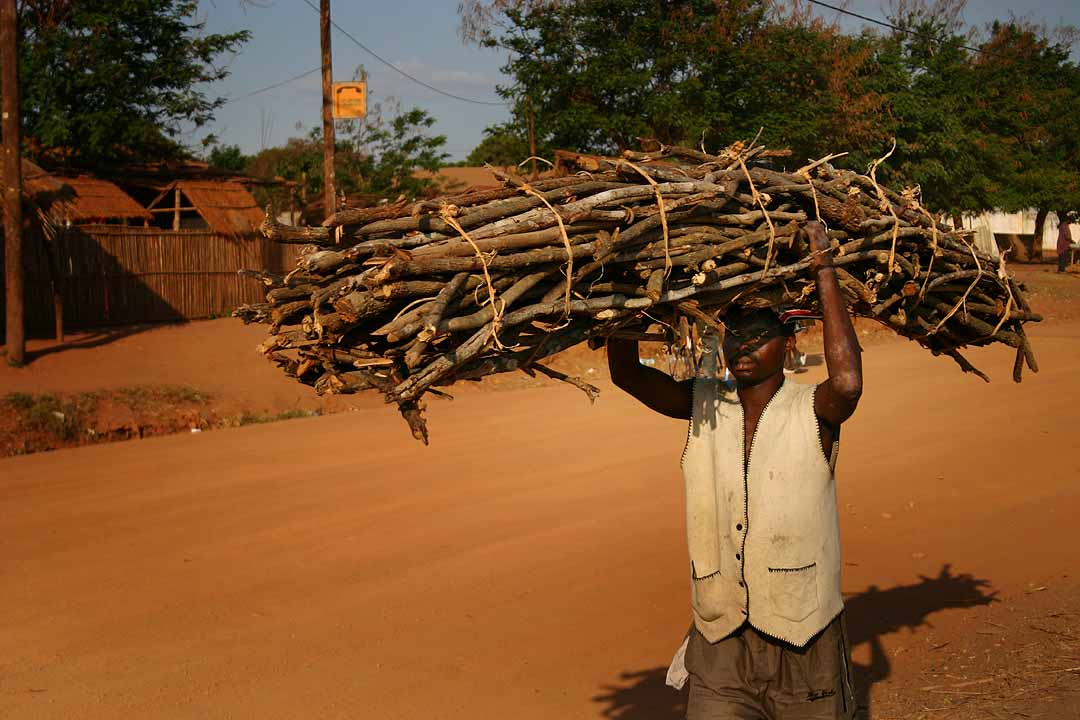
Firewood collector in Mozambique

Cutting firewood with a chainsaw

A video demonstrating cooking with firewood

=== North America ===
Some firewood is harvested in "woodlots" managed for that purpose, but in heavily wooded areas, it is more often harvested as a byproduct of natural forests. Deadfall that has not started to rot is preferred, since it is already partly seasoned. Standing dead timber is considered better still, because it has less humid organic material on the trunk, which allows collection tools to stay sharper longer, and is less likely to be rotten. Despite popular belief, studies have shown that harvesting this form of timber typically does not reduce the speed and intensity of bushfires. Such harvesting reduces the available habitat for snag-nesting animals such as owls, bats, and some rodents.

Harvesting timber for firewood is frequently carried out by hand with chainsaws; although hand-felling with an axe is also possible. Thus, longer pieces, requiring less manual labour and less chainsaw fuel, are less expensive and only limited by the size of the firebox. In most of the United States, the standard measure of firewood is a cord, or 128 cubic feet (3.6 m^{3}); however, firewood can also be sold by weight. The wood's heating value can affect the price. Prices also vary considerably based upon the distance from woodlots and the quality of the wood. Buying and burning firewood that was cut only a short distance from its final destination helps prevent the accidental spread of invasive tree-killing insects and diseases.

=== Nigeria ===
Due to its affordability, firewood in Nigeria is used for various purposes, which includes the preparation of food (particularly in traditional stoves), heating buildings, producing charcoal, and within various cultural and religious practices. Firewood is also often used in small-scale and artisanal production processes.

== Preparing ==
In most of the world, firewood is transported near the place where it will be used as fuel and prepared there. The process of making charcoal from firewood can take place at the place where the firewood is harvested.

Most firewood also requires splitting, which allows for faster seasoning by exposing more surface area. Splitting can be done with a hydraulic splitting machine or manually (using a splitting maul or a wedge and sledge hammer). Steel wedges have an angled blade so the mechanical advantage increases with depth. More unusual is a tapered screw-style design that augers into the wood, splitting it, which can be powered by a power take-off drive, a dedicated internal combustion engine, or a rugged electric pipe-threading machine. Another method is to use a kinetic log splitter, which uses a rack and pinion system powered by a small motor and a large flywheel used for energy storage. Firewood processors are also utilized in some parts of the world to process larger quantities of firewood.

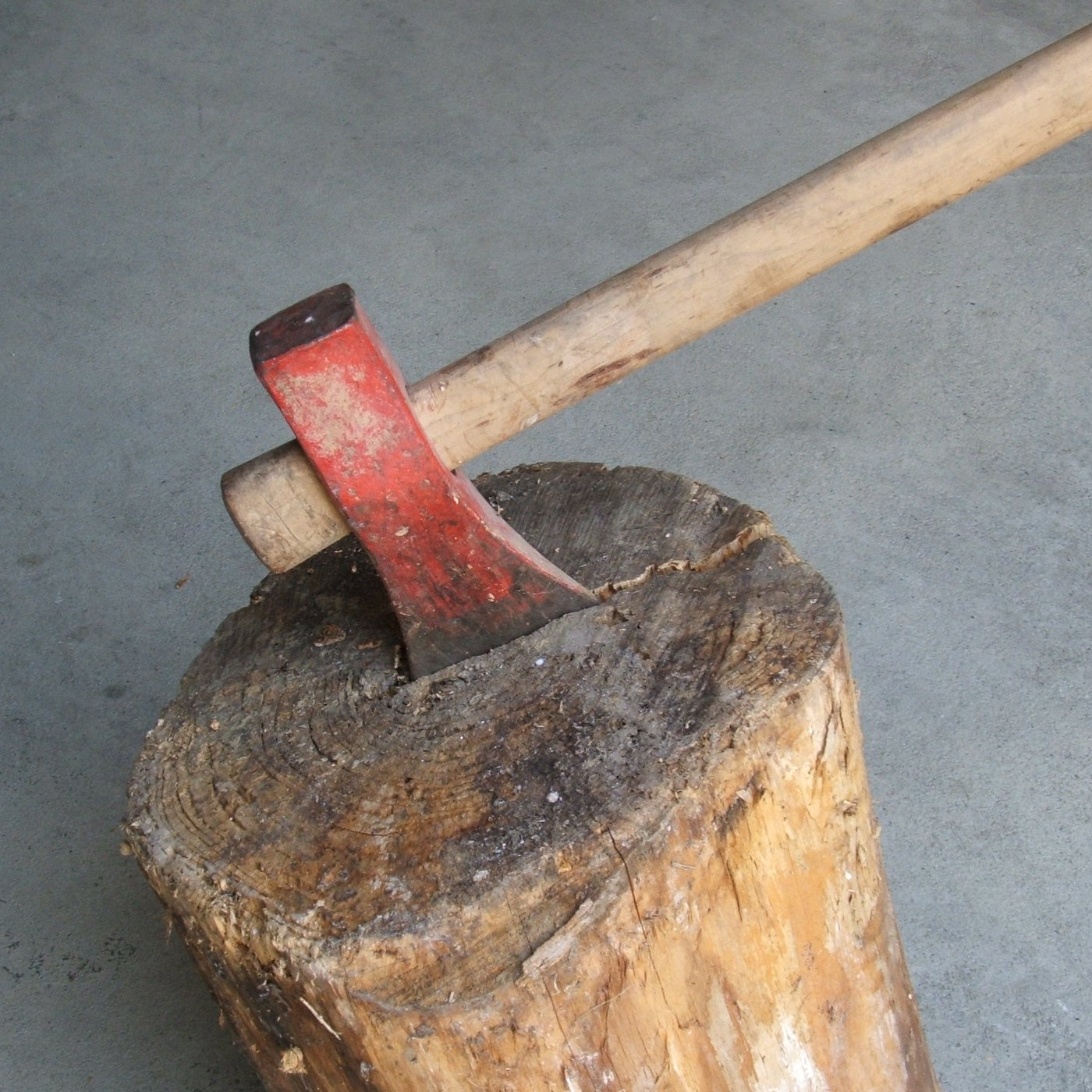
Italian-style splitting axe

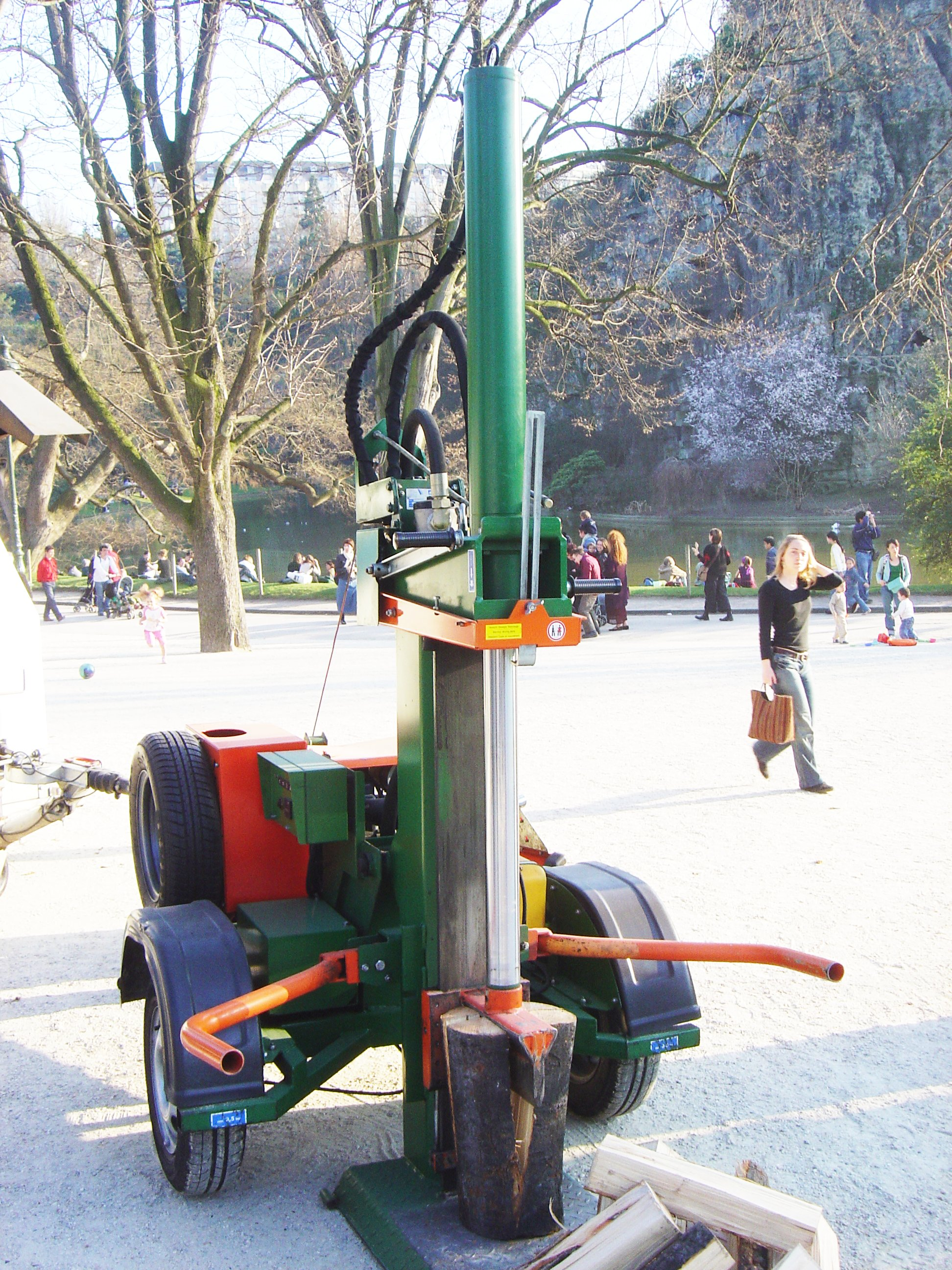
Hydraulic wood splitting machine

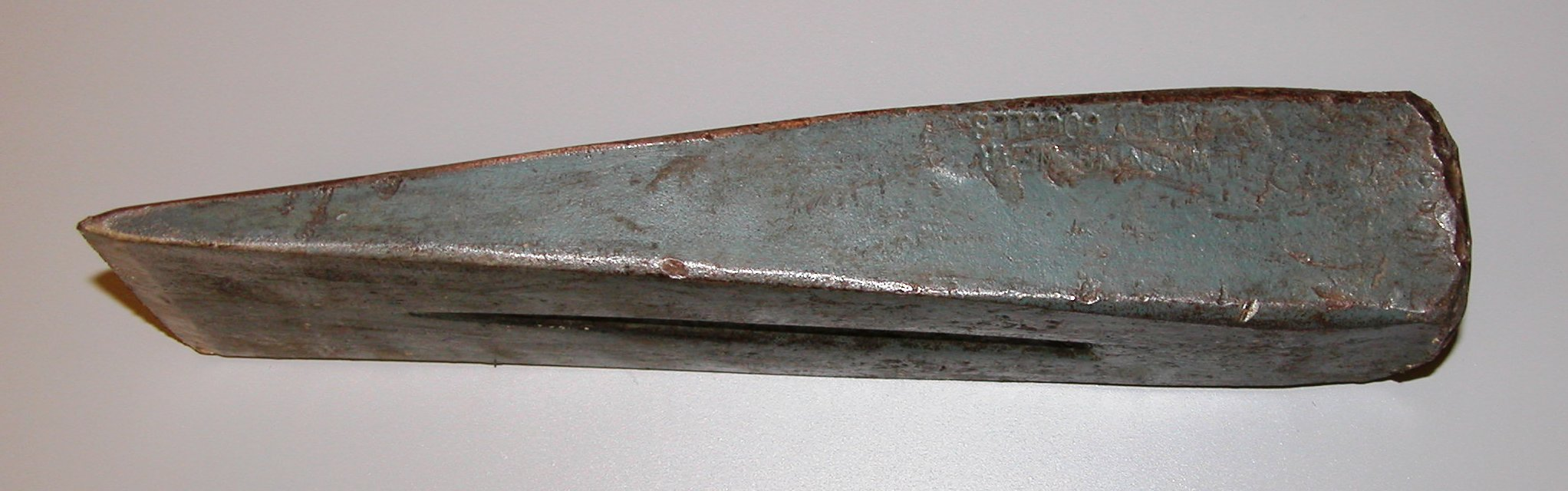
Steel wedge for splitting firewood

== Storing ==
Methods of firewood storage range from simple piles to free-standing stacks or specialized structures. Usually, the goal of storing wood is to keep water away from it and to continue the drying process.

Stacks: In the simplest stack logs are placed next to and on top of each other, forming a line the width of the logs. The height of the stack can vary, generally depending upon how the ends are constructed. Without constructing ends, the length of the log and the length of the pile help determine the height of a free-standing stack.

When determining whether wood should be covered during the drying process, there is a trade-off between preventing the surface of the wood from getting wet and allowing as much wind and sun as possible to access the stack. A cover can be almost any material that sheds water – a large piece of plywood, sheet metal, terracotta tiles, an oiled canvas cloth, or plastic sheeting. Wood will not dry when completely enclosed. Ideally, pallets or scrap wood are used to raise the wood from the ground, reducing rot and increasing air flow.

There are many ways to create the ends of a stack. A crib end is created by alternating pairs of logs to help stabilize the end. A stake or pole placed in the ground is another way to end the pile. A series of stacked logs at the end, each with a cord tied to it and the free end of the cord wrapped around the log in the middle of the pile, will also suffice.

A covered stack of firewood outdoors

Under a roof: Under a roof, there are no concerns about the wood being subjected to rain, snow, or run-off, but ventilation needs to be provided if the wood is stored green so that moisture released from the wood does not recondense inside. Whether split or in 'rounds' (flush-cut and unsplit segments of logs), the wood is stacked lengthwise. If the wood needs further seasoning, adequate air flow must be maintained through the stack.

Storing outdoors: Firewood is stacked with the bark facing upwards. This allows water to drain off, and standing frost, ice, or snow to be kept from the wood. Storing wood near a dwelling increases the likelihood that insects such as termites will become established indoors. Storing firewood indoors for any extended period of time increases the risk of introducing insects such as termites into the home.

Round stacks can be made in many ways. Some are piles of wood with a stacked circular wall around them. Others, like the (rather uncommon) American Holz Hausen, are more complicated. A Holz hausen, or "wood house", is a circular method of stacking wood; proponents say it speeds up drying on a relatively small footprint. A traditional Holz hausen has a 10-foot diameter, stands 10 feet high, and holds about 6 cords of wood. The walls are made of pieces arranged radially and tilted slightly inward for stability. The inside pieces are stacked on end to form a chimney for air flow. The top pieces are tilted slightly outward to shed rain and are placed bark side up.

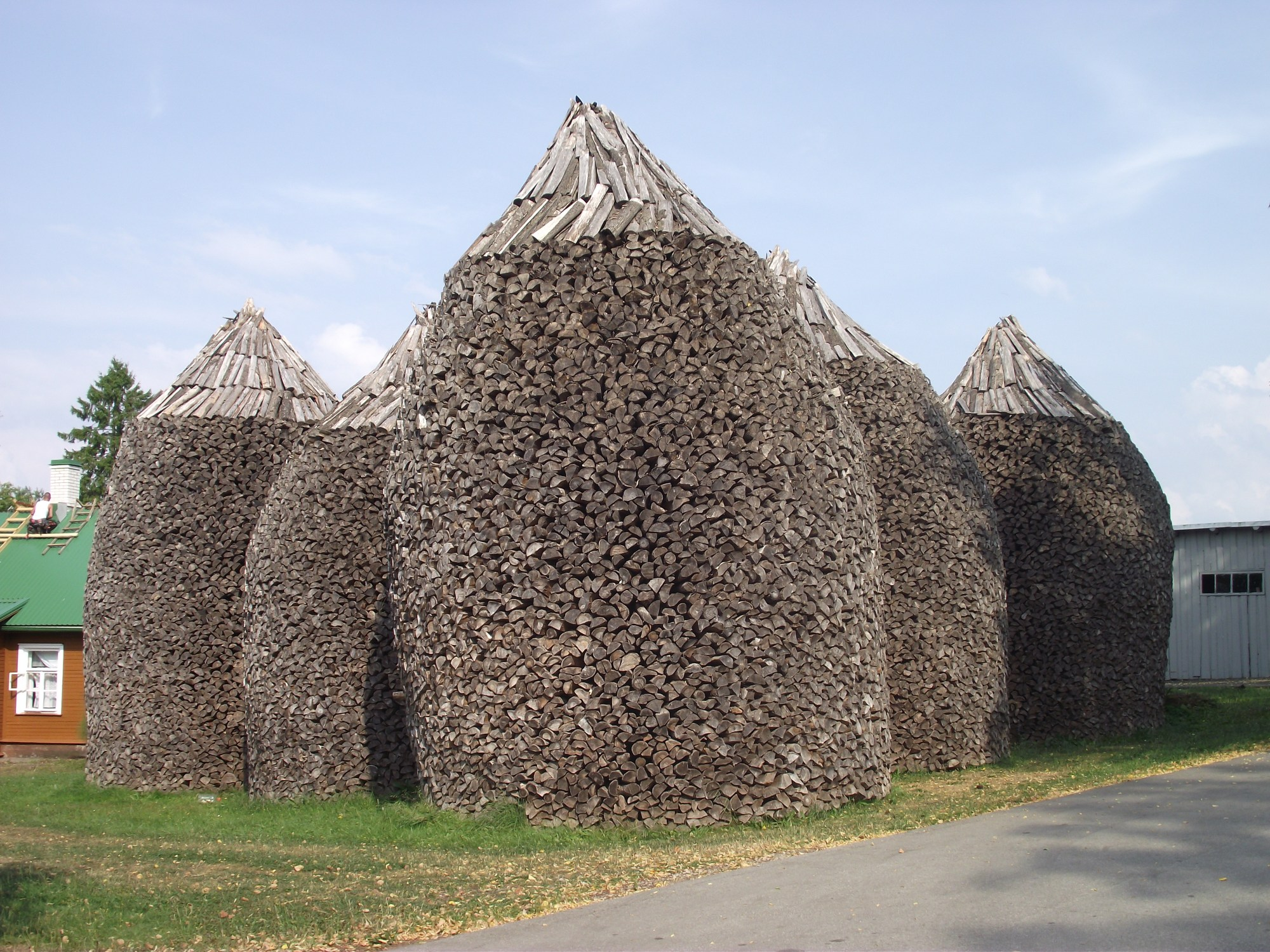
Firewood stacks at Pühtitsa Convent in Estonia are about 6 metres (20 ft) high.

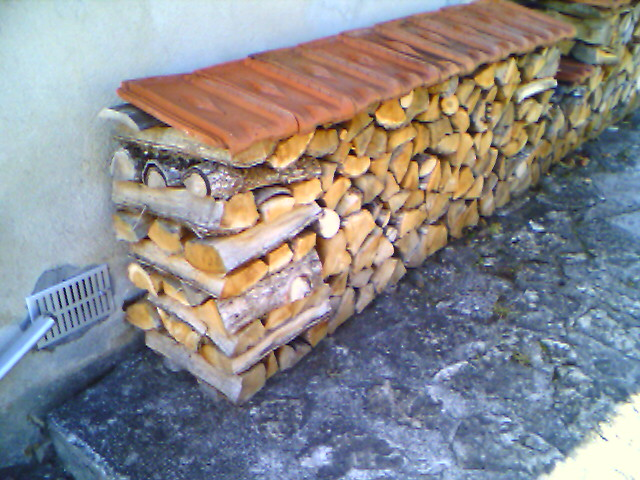
Stacked with crib end, in eastern France, covered by terracotta tiles.

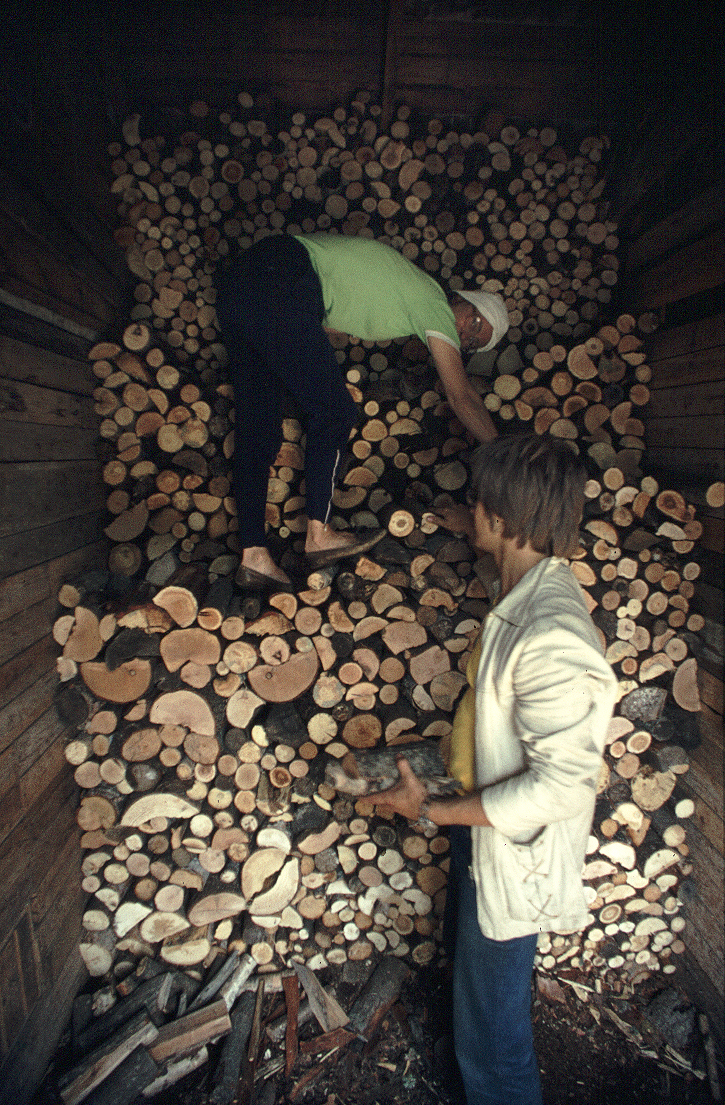
Stacking firewood in a shed

== Heating value ==
Firewood in a fireplace

The moisture content of firewood determines how it burns and how much heat is released. Unseasoned (green) wood moisture content varies by its species; green wood may weigh 70 to 100 percent more than seasoned wood due to water content. Typically, seasoned (dry) wood has 20% or less moisture content. Use of the lower heating value is advised as a reasonable standard way of reporting this data.

The energy content of a measure of wood depends on the tree species. For example, it can range from 15.5 to 32 million British thermal units per cord (4.5 to 9.3 GJ/m^{3}). The higher the moisture content, the more energy that must be used to evaporate (boil) the water in the wood before it will burn. Dry wood delivers more energy for heating than green wood of the same species.

The Sustainable Energy Development Office (SEDO), part of the Government of Western Australia states that the energy content of wood is 4.5 kWh/kg or 16.2 gigajoules/tonne (GJ/t).

Here are some examples of energy content of several species of wood:

Wood Species	Heating value (million BTU per cord)	Heating value (GJ per m^{3})
Tamarack	22.3	6.5
Birch	21.3	6.2
Red Fir	20.6	6.0
White Fir	16.7	4.9

=== Kiln (oven) dried firewood ===
To reduce the drying time to a number of days from the normal one to three years, an external heating source such as a kiln or oven may be used. The process of kiln or oven drying firewood was invented by Anthony Cutara, for which a successful US patent was filed in 1983. In 1987 the US Department of Agriculture replicated the method and published a detailed procedure for the production of kiln dried firewood, citing the higher heat output and increased combustion efficiency as a key benefit of the process.

== Measurement ==
Commercially packaged firewood made from beetle-kill spruce wood

Usually firewood is sold by volume. While a specific volume term may be used, there can be a wide variation in what this means and what the measure can produce as a fuel. A measure of green unseasoned wood with 65% moisture contains less usable energy than when it has been dried to 20%. Regardless of the term, firewood measurement is best thought of as an estimate.

=== Traditional English ===
Early modern England measured firewood in terms of billets and bavins. A billet, like a bavin, was a piece of kindling wood. The 16th century standardised a billet as three foot four inches in length, and ten inches around (for open fires); and a bavin as three foot long and two feet round (a chunkier log, often used for ovens).

=== Metric ===
In the metric system, firewood is usually sold by the stère, equivalent to a volume of 1 cubic meter (0.276 cord). The most common firewood piece lengths are 33 cm (13 in) and 50 cm (20 in). Wood can also be sold by the kilogram or by the tonne, as in Australia.

=== North America ===
In the United States and Canada, firewood is usually sold by the full cord, face cord or bag.

- A full cord or bush cord has a volume of 128 cubic feet (3.6 m^{3}), including wood, bark, and air space in a neatly stacked pile. The actual wood volume of a cord may be in the range of 80 to 100 cubic feet (2.3 to 2.8 m^{3}) as stacked wood takes up more space than a piece of solid wood. The most common firewood piece length is 16 inches (41 cm).
- The volume of a face cord or a rick depends on the length of the logs that are stacked in a 4 by 8 ft (1.22 by 2.44 m) pile. When 16 in (41 cm) logs are used, the volume is 42 2/3 cubic feet (1.21 m^{3}) which is one third of a full or bush cord stack of wood.

== Damage to health and environment ==
Burning firewood can cause respiratory issues and other illnesses. Along with clearance for agriculture firewood is a cause of deforestation.

== In popular culture ==
- Jane Austen in 1814 complained to her sister that "My Mother's Wood is brought in-but by some mistake, no Bavins. She must therefore buy some". (Contemporary charges were between 6 and 15 shillings per hundred bavins).
- In Norway, the non-fiction book Hel Ved (In English: Solid Wood: All About Chopping, Drying and Stacking Wood – and the Soul of Wood-Burning) by Lars Mytting became a bestseller in 2011–2012, selling 150,000 copies. A version of the book has also been published in Sweden, selling 50,000 copies.
- In February 2013, the Norwegian state broadcast NRK sent a 12-hour live program on the topic of firewood, where a large part of the program consisted of showing firewood burning in a fireplace. More than one million people, 20% of Norway's population, saw part of the program.
- Thoren Bradley went viral on Instagram in 2020 for creating content focused on cutting wood for use as firewood.

== See also ==
- Biomass
- Cordwood construction
- Estovers
- Multipurpose tree
- Wood ash
- Wood fuel
