= HP BASIC =

HP BASIC may refer to any of several different BASIC dialects, of distinct lineages, created at either Hewlett-Packard (HP) or Digital Equipment Corporation (DEC).

- HP Time-Shared BASIC, created at HP in the 1960s; for HP 2100 series minicomputers
- Rocky Mountain BASIC, created at HP, now transferred to Keysight; for HP 9000 and other platforms; often used with HP-IB instruments
- VSI BASIC for OpenVMS, created at DEC, and previously known as HP BASIC for OpenVMS prior to the transfer to VSI; for the RSTS, VMS, PDP, VAX, Alpha, and Integrity platforms
- BASIC (HP Series 80), created at HP in the 1980s; for the HP Series 80 desktop computers
- BASIC (HP calculators), created at HP in the 1980s; for HP calculators
- Prime Programming Language (PPL), created at HP in the 1990s; for the HP 38, 39, 40, and Prime algebraic/graphing calculators; once called "HP Basic"

== See also ==
- BASIC - BASIC language and dialects in general
- HP HPL - High Performance Language for the HP 9800 series
