= HP 9845 =

Line of desktop computers by Hewlett-Packard

The HP 9845 series is a line of desktop computers from Hewlett-Packard. The 9845 models included a CRT display; they were programmed in BASIC.

The 9845 models use big-endian 16-bit NMOS microprocessors, the instruction sets of which have roots in the HP 2116A which were one of the first 16-bit microprocessors created.

== 9845A/S ==
The first models, introduced in 1978, were the 9845A and 9845S. The 9845A included 16KB of memory and a tape cartridge drive; the 9845S had 64KB of memory, two tape cartridge drives, a built-in printer, and support for graphics.

== 9845B/T ==
The 9845B and 9845T models were introduced in 1979. The 9845B included 64KB of memory and a tape cartridge drive; the 9845T had 192KB of memory, two tape cartridge drives, a built-in printer, and support for graphics.

== 9835A/B ==
Smaller, lighter models, the 9835A and 9835B, were introduced in 1979. The 9835A had a 25-line, 80-character CRT display with no graphics support; the 9835B had a single-line 32-character LED display. Both models could run most 9845A BASIC programs, and also supported assembly-language programming.

== 9845C ==
HP 9845
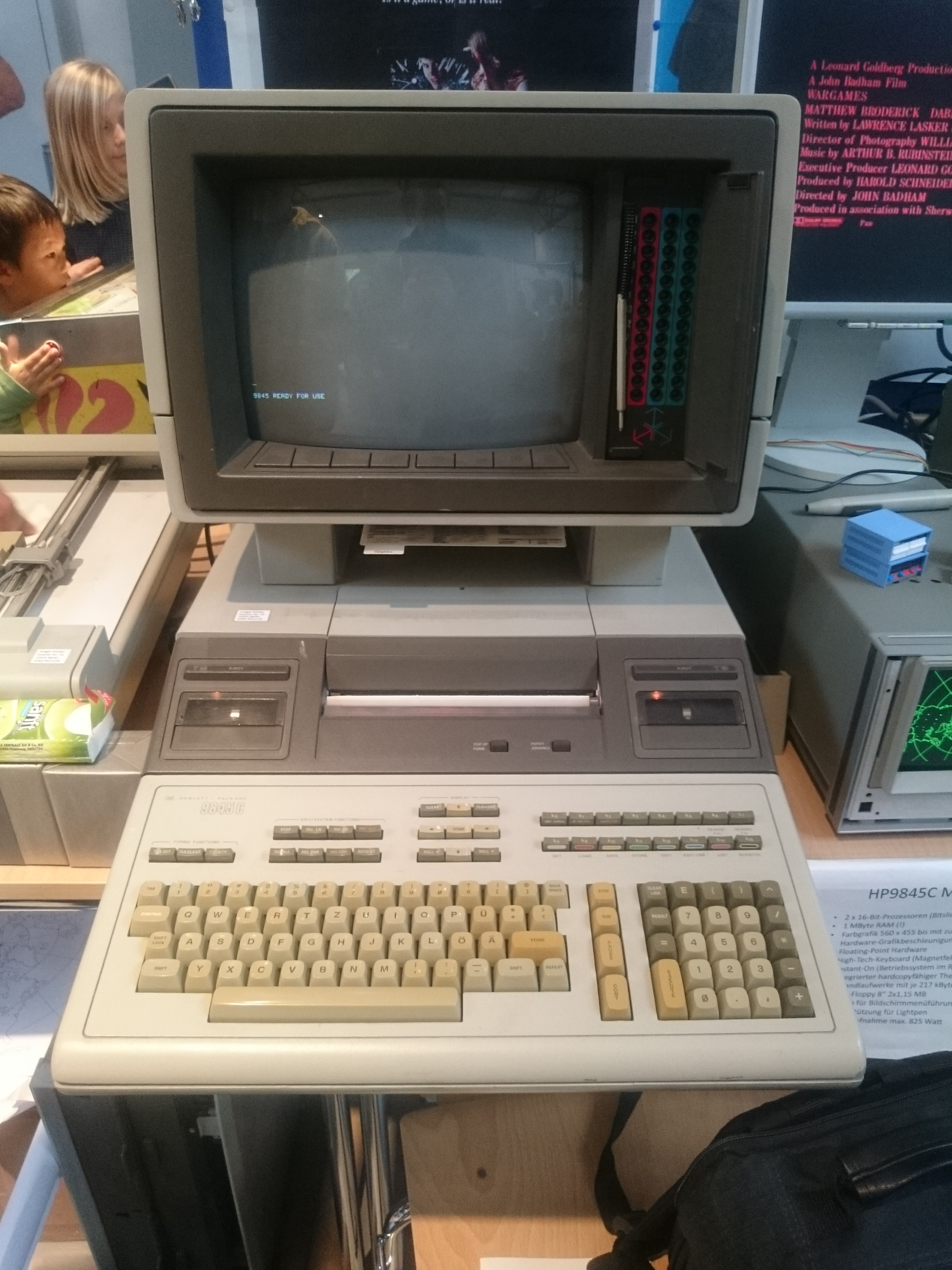
- Developer: Hewlett-Packard
- Type: Desktop computer
- Released: 1980
- Introductory price: US$39,500 (today $154,300)
- Discontinued: 1984 (being outcompeted by the 200 series)
- CPU: Standard option 1xx: 2 x 16-bit (LPU, PPU) 3-chip hybrid processor with BPC, IOC and EMC Enhanced option 2xx: 1 x bit-slice processor (LPU); 1 x 16-bit hybrid (PPU) @ 5.7 MHz
- Memory: 64 - 1600 KB RAM; 128 KB ROM
- Graphics: 560 x 455 pixels @ 3 bpp (8 color)
- Power: Processor: 275 W (max), CRT display: 550 W (max)
- Weight: 48.1 kg (106 lb)

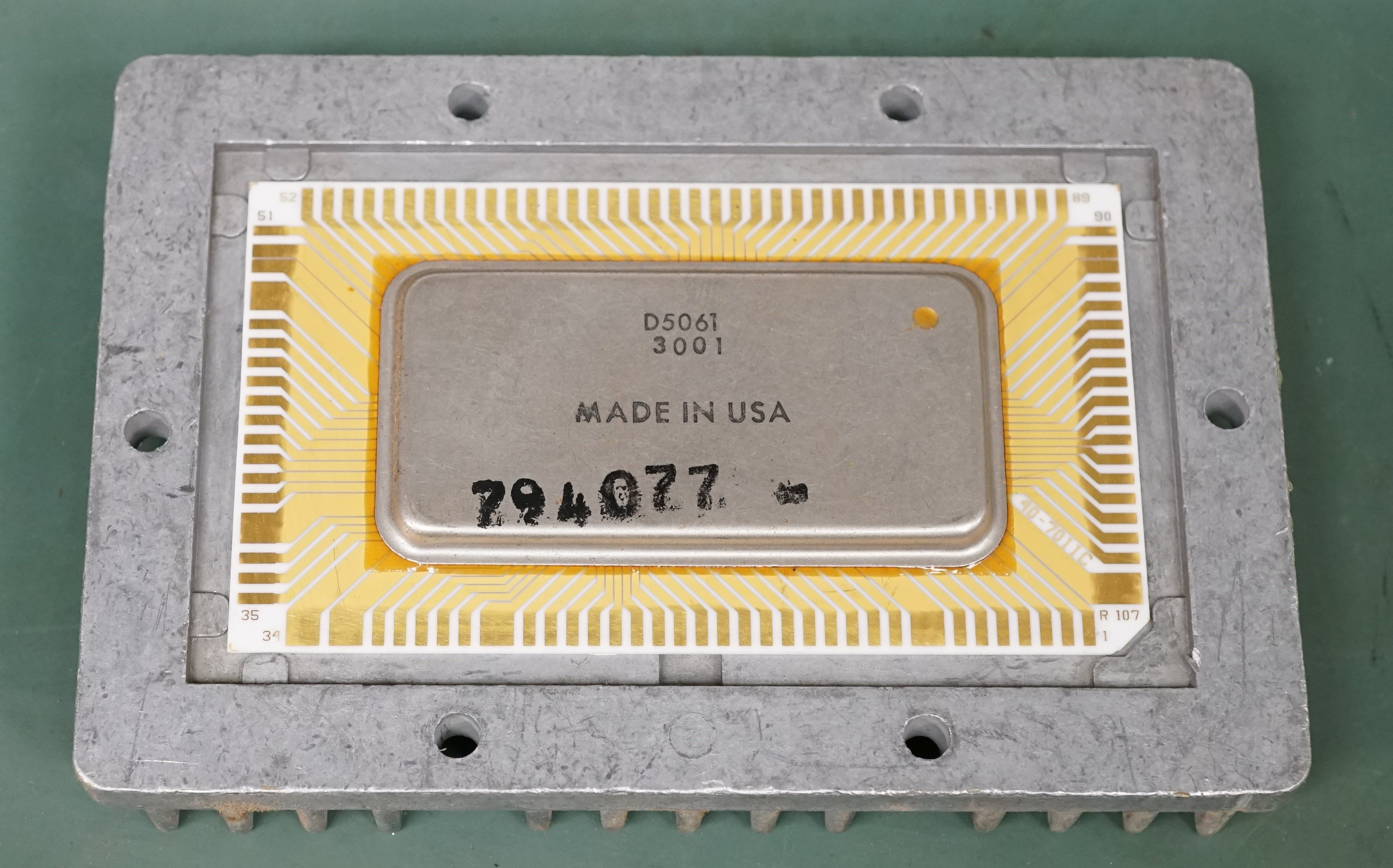
HP 5061-3001 16-bit 4-chip hybrid processor used as the LPU & PPU processors in the HP 9845 series computers. Contains the BPC, IOC, EMC and AEC die.

The HP 9845C, introduced in 1980, was one of the first desktop computers to be equipped with a color display and light pen for design and illustration work. It was used to create the color war room graphics in the 1983 movie WarGames.

=== Features ===
The attached HP 98770A color display enabled the color graphics with its own CPU and separate power supply, a vector generator based on the AMD2900 bit-slice architecture, graphics memory with three planes of 32 KB each, the connection interface to the processor consists of a direct data bus attachment, and a light-pen logic. 4913 colors were available.

The display showed 8 soft keys on the lower end of the screen, 39 alignment controllers behind a door enabled fine tuning of color convergence.

A builtin tape cartridge device with a capacity of 217 kB and transfer speed of 1440 bytes/s enabled storage of data. Average access time for the unit is 6s and a rewind end to end takes 20s. The directory is stored in r/w memory to enable quick access.

Graphics display speed (vectors/sec, overlapped and not clipped)
	Option 1xx	Option 2xx
For/Next	~95	~145
Matrix Plot	~200	~240
Absolute Plot	~5 000	~5 000
Circles/s not clipped	~2	~5

== Option 200 ==
In 1982, higher-performance versions of the 9845B and 9845C, the Option 200 models, were introduced. They replaced the NMOS microprocessor with an AMD 2900-based processor. The microcode of the 2900-based processor included time-critical versions of the BASIC interpreter, speeding up BASIC programs by up to seven times.

== Games ==
There are four commercial game compilations for the HP 9845 computers, all released from Hewlett-Packard: 9845 Computer Games Collection, 9845B Computer Games Library, Computer Games Library Vol. 1 and Monte Carlo Simulation.

== See also ==
- HP 9800 series HP desktop computer product line
- HP DC100 - DC100 tape format and drive
- LDS-1 (Line Drawing System-1)
