= Data processing (disambiguation) =

Data processing is the collection and manipulation of data to produce meaningful information, especially by computers.

Data processing may also refer to:

- Automatic Data Processing, a computer services company
- Data analysis, the processing of data with the goal of highlighting, drawing conclusions, and supporting decision making
- Data entry performed by a data entry clerk
- Data processing system, a system which processes data which has been captured and encoded in a format style recognizable by the data processing system or has been created and stored by another unit of an information processing system
- Electronic data processing, the use of automated methods to process data
- Information and Software Technology, a scientific journal formerly published under the name Data Processing
- Information processing, the change (processing) of information in any manner detectable by an observer
- Unit record equipment, a class of machines that processed data before the advent of electronic computers
