= Processor =

Processor may refer to:

== Computing ==
=== Hardware ===
- Processor (computing)
  - Central processing unit (CPU), the hardware within a computer that executes a program
    - Microprocessor, a central processing unit contained on a single integrated circuit (IC)
      - Application-specific instruction set processor (ASIP), a component used in system-on-a-chip design
      - Boot processor, a processor that initialize hardware on boot process, usually integrated on CPU or SoC
      - Graphics processing unit (GPU), a processor designed for doing dedicated graphics-rendering computations
      - Physics processing unit (PPU), a dedicated microprocessor designed to handle the calculations of physics
      - Digital signal processor (DSP), a specialized microprocessor designed specifically for digital signal processing
        - Image processor, a specialized DSP used for image processing in digital cameras, mobile phones or other devices
        - Audio processor
      - Neural processing unit (NPU), a class of specialized hardware accelerator or computer system designed to accelerate artificial intelligence and machine learning applications, including artificial neural networks and machine vision
      - Vision processing unit (VPU), an emerging (as of 2023) class of microprocessor; it is a specific type of AI accelerator, designed to accelerate machine vision tasks
      - Tensor Processing Unit (TPU), an AI accelerator application-specific integrated circuit (ASIC) developed by Google for neural network machine learning, using Google's own TensorFlow software.
      - Secure cryptoprocessor
      - Quantum processor, a computer that takes advantage of quantum mechanical phenomena. At small scales, physical matter exhibits properties of both particles and waves, and quantum computing leverages this behavior, specifically quantum superposition and entanglement, using specialized hardware that supports the preparation and manipulation of quantum states.
      - Coprocessor
      - Floating-point unit
      - Video processor
      - Network processor, a microprocessor specifically targeted at the networking application domain
      - Baseband processor
  - Multi-core processor, single component with two or more independent CPUs (called "cores") on the same chip carrier or on the same die
  - System on a chip, a chip including one or more processor cores, such as CPUs, GPUs and others, and additional support circuitry
  - Front-end processor, a helper processor for communication between a host computer and other devices

=== Software ===
- Word processor, a computer application used for the production of potentially printable material
- Document processor, a computer application that superficially resembles a word processor—but emphasizes the visual layout of the document's components

=== Systems ===
- Data processing system, a combination of machines, people, and processes that for a set of inputs produces a defined set of outputs
- Information system, a system composed of people and computers that processes or interprets information

== Other ==
- Firewood processor, a machine designed to cut and split firewood
- Food processor, an appliance used to facilitate repetitive tasks in the preparation of food

== See also ==
- Process (disambiguation)
- Controller (computing)
- Data processing (disambiguation)
