= Information processing =

Information processing may refer to:

- Data processing in computer science, the collection and manipulation of digital data to produce meaningful information, esp.
  - Electronic data processing, the use of automated methods to process data
- Information processing (psychology) an approach to the goal of understanding human thinking
