= Stack (unit) =

Stack was a US unit of volume for stacked firewood. The symbol for the unit was stk.

== Definition ==
108 cubic foot.

== Conversion ==
1 stack ≡ 64 Load (squared)

1 stack ≡ 64 cubic foot

1 stack ≡ 64 m^{3}
