= Firewood processor =

Cutting machine

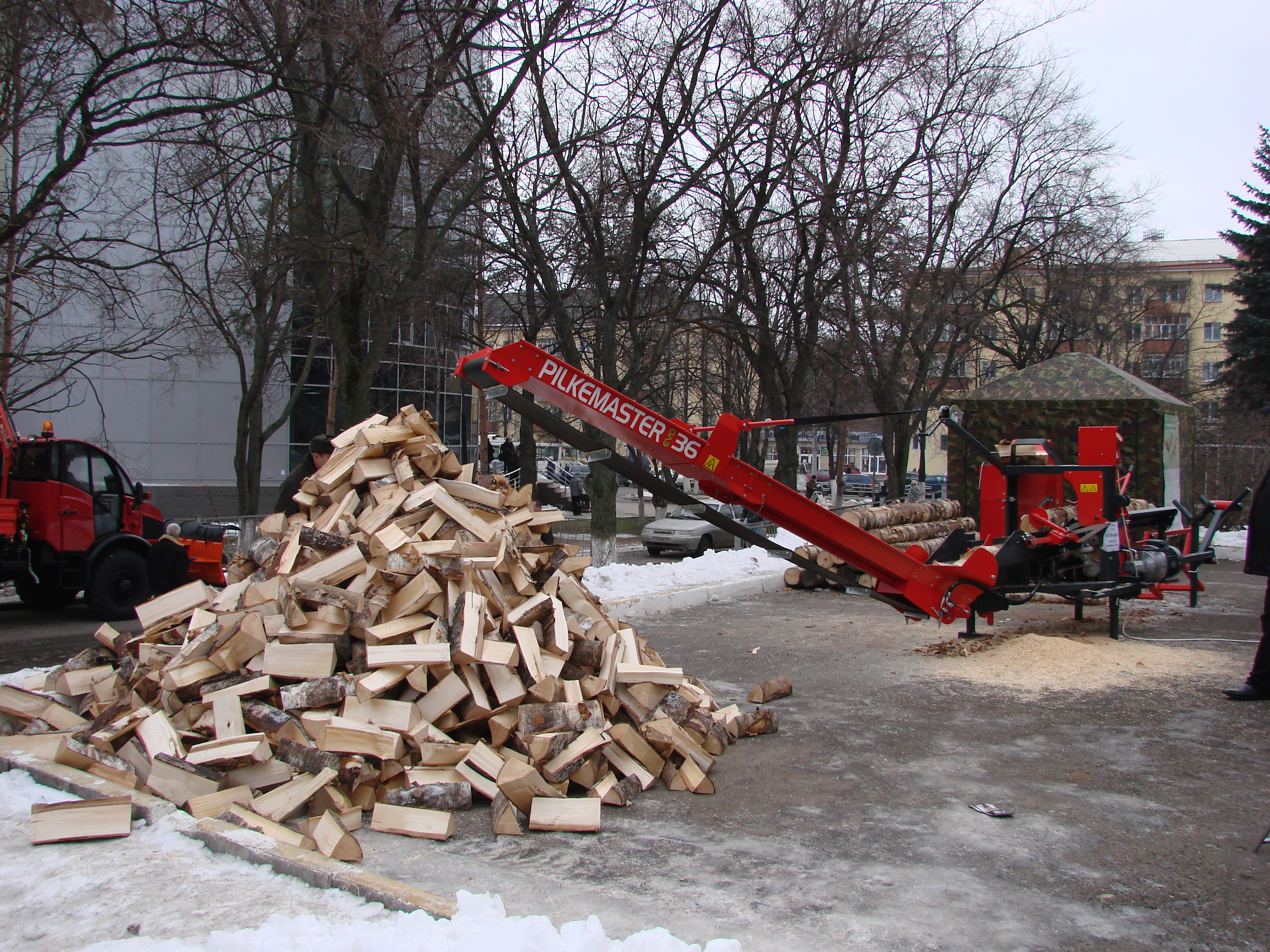
A firewood processor in Russia

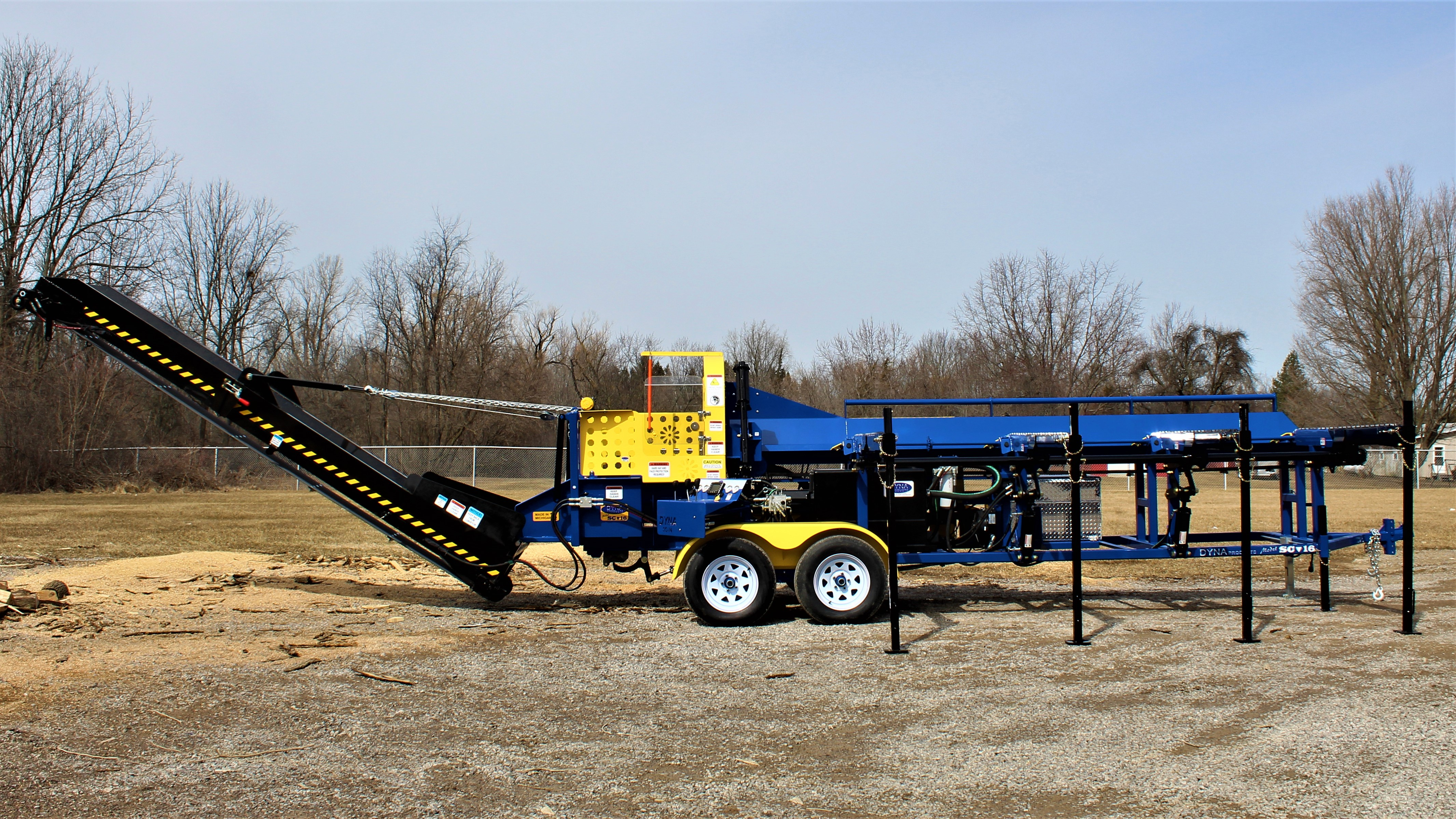
Firewood Processor in USA

A firewood processor is a machine designed to cut and split firewood with minimal manual handling of the logs. There are typically four main parts of the machine, each dedicated to a separate function. Processing begins with a log pile – a pile of logs that have been de-limbed and cut to an appropriate length, generally 12–20 feet (3.7–6.1 m). Popular brands include DYNA, Multitek, Cord King, Wood Beaver, Hakki Pilke, Timberwolf, and Blockbuster. Many individuals use processors commercially, while some use them privately as a hobby. If someone has a small amount of wood they'd like to split but don't want to spend a lot of money, there's options to rent processors as an alternative to purchasing.

== Log deck ==
Logs are stacked onto the log deck using a piece of equipment ranging from a skid steer to a small excavator with a grapple. Each log is pulled mechanically into a trough by chain or belts on the log deck. Once in the "trough" the operator of the processor can move the log into position to be sawn into firewood-length pieces (often called “rounds”).

== Saw station ==
The log is sawn by either a hydraulically operated chainsaw harvester bar, or on larger machines, a very large circular saw blade, or a guillotine powered either directly from a pto (tractor or engine powered) or by hydraulics. When the cut is completed, the "round" drops into position to be split in the next process.

== Splitting chamber ==
Here, the log is simply forced into a wedge that splits the round into anywhere between two and sixteen pieces, depending on the size of the logs and the intended market. Multitek North America patented a 16 way, box head splitter which can handle up to 18 inch diameter logs. Timberwolf's 4-way, 6-way, 8-way and 12-way wedges are designed to handle up to 24in diameter logs.

== Outfeed ==
Typically a conveyor -chain or belt- pulls the split firewood away from the processor and into a waiting delivery truck's box or a woodpile for later handling. Some setups will use multiple conveyors and introduce a tumbling system to clean the firewood.

The output capacity of a firewood processor varies with the size and cost of the machine, from one cord per hour on a $22,000 entry-level machine (2020 prices)., up to five or six cords per hour on a $60,000 industrial machine. (2020 prices). See notes on output capacity ratings below.

The choice of machine depends on a large number of variables other than straight production output. Different markets require different processing. For example, people who heat with large outside wood boilers prefer large, slow-burning pieces of hardwood, while a good campfire is made of small pieces of fast-burning softwood. Restaurants with wood-fired ovens prefer small pieces as well, but of hardwood or specialty species.

== Misconceptions and areas of confusion ==
The physics of the process demand that it requires a larger machine to make smaller pieces of firewood, and the species of logs being processed may also dictate machine size and power requirements.

== Output ratings ==
Every manufacturer lists an output rating of cords per hour. Even the lightest-duty machines will split two cords of green, frozen 8 in (20 cm) Aspen into halves 16 in (41 cm) long quickly. Changing any one of these optimal variables (condition, temperature, size, species, number of splits, or length of round) will reduce the rate of output, making meaningful comparison between manufacturers' claims difficult. The most effective way to determine how fast a machine really is would be either in person or by watching detailed videos of it processing wood. At Timberwolf, each machine is tested and timed for advertisement accuracy with an output rating of 2.5+ cords per hour for the Pro-MP Series and an output rating of 4+ cords per hour for the Pro-HD Series.

== Cycle time ==
This term is frequently misunderstood. While the definition is understood to be the time it takes the splitter ram to fully extend and retract, there is no consideration of force in this equation. In proper terms, cycle time is simply a mathematical calculation of the size of a cylinder's bore, stroke and rod diameter, and the ability of that combination to act at a given flow of hydraulic oil in GPM. A properly designed advanced hydraulic systems can use Regenerative systems to both accelerate cycle times and maintain full pressure. The Pro-MP and Pro-HD Series Firewood Processors by Timberwolf have been engineered to have cycle times as low as 5 seconds.

== Saw type ==
While most processors use a hydraulic chainsaw bar to cut the logs to length, some use a very large circular saw blade called a slasher blade. They are fast and efficient, requiring little maintenance once set up properly. While the safety of slasher blades has been proven over decades, there are a number of people who will not walk within 50 feet (15 m) of one. The more traditional chainsaw bar setup requires constant oiling and frequent maintenance, but it is simple and familiar work.

== Safety ==
The reduction in manual labor is obvious, but few immediately recognize the improvement in safety conditions. Everything related to logging is dangerous, but eliminating a great deal of the need for workers to use chainsaws or wrestle heavy rounds onto a splitter measurably reduces the incidence of injury on these job sites. The fact that it takes fewer workers to produce the same amount of firewood further reduces these risks.
