= SDA =

SDA or sda may refer to:

== Science and technology ==
=== Computing ===
- /dev/sda, the first mass-storage disk in Unix-like operating systems
- T-Mobile SDA, a smartphone
- Screen Design Aid, a utility program used by midrange IBM computer systems
- SD Card Association, responsible for Secure Digital memory card standards
- Serial Data Signal of an I²C electronic bus
- Slow DoS attack
- Symbolic data analysis

=== Life sciences ===
- Sabouraud dextrose agar, microbiological media allows fungus to grow
- SDA (drug), an entactogen drug related to MDA
- Serotonin–dopamine antagonist, atypical antipsychotic
- Specific dynamic action, the thermic effect of food
- Stearidonic acid, omega-3 fatty acid
- Structured digital abstract, describing relationships between biological entities

=== Other uses in science and technology ===
- Scratch drive actuator, a microelectromechanical device
- Space domain awareness, the ability to detect, track, and characterize passive and active space objects
- Stereo Dimensional Array, a Polk Audio technology

== Organizations ==
=== Educational institutions ===
- San Dieguito Academy, Encinitas, California, US
- SDA Bocconi School of Management, in Milan, Italy

=== Political groups ===
- Secular Democratic Alliance (India)
- Singapore Democratic Alliance
- Social Democratic Alliance (UK)
- Social Democratic Alliance in Vietnam
- South Devon Alliance in England
- Party of Democratic Action (Bosnian: Stranka demokratske akcije), a political party in Bosnia and Herzegovina

=== Other organizations ===
- Security & Defence Agenda, a Brussels-based think-tank
- Seventh-day Adventist Church, a Protestant Christian denomination
- Shandong Airlines, an airline in China
- Shop, Distributive and Allied Employees Association, Australia
- Southern Dames of America, lineage society in the United States
- Space Development Agency, a US DoD RDT&E agency
- Systemic Design Association, for systems design
- Swiss Telegraphic Agency (German: Schweizerische Depeschenagentur)

== Other uses ==
- SDA Tennis Open, a tournament held in Bercuit, Belgium
- Saddam International Airport, now Baghdad International Airport, airport code SDA
- Same-day affirmation of financial market deals
- San Diego and Arizona Railway, reporting mark SDA
- Severe Disablement Allowance, a UK state benefit
- Southern Domestic Airspace, Canada
- Specially denatured alcohol
- Speed Demos Archive of video game speedruns
