= Microbotics =

Branch of robotics

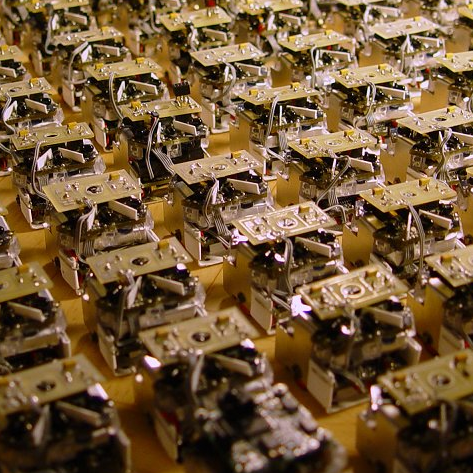
Jasmine minirobots each smaller than 3 cm (1 in) in width

Microbotics (or microrobotics) is the field of miniature robotics, in particular mobile robots with characteristic dimensions less than 1 mm. The term can also be used for robots capable of handling micrometer size components.

== History ==
Microbots were born thanks to the appearance of the microcontroller in the last decade of the 20th century, and the appearance of microelectromechanical systems (MEMS) on silicon, although many microbots do not use silicon for mechanical components other than sensors. The earliest research and conceptual design of such small robots was conducted in the early 1970s in (then) classified research for U.S. intelligence agencies. Applications envisioned at that time included prisoner of war rescue assistance and electronic intercept missions. The underlying miniaturization support technologies were not fully developed at that time, so that progress in prototype development was not immediately forthcoming from this early set of calculations and concept design. As of 2008, the smallest microrobots used a scratch drive actuator. Microrobots using surface electrochemical actuators were later demonstrated in 2020.

The development of Wireless connections, especially Wi-Fi (i.e. in household networks) has greatly increased the communication capacity of microbots, and consequently their ability to coordinate with other microbots to carry out more complex tasks. Indeed, much recent research has focused on microbot communication, including a 1,024 robot swarm at Harvard University that assembles itself into various shapes; and manufacturing microbots at SRI International for DARPA's "MicroFactory for Macro Products" program that can build lightweight, high-strength structures.

Microbots called xenobots have also been built using biological tissues instead of metal and electronics. Xenobots avoid some of the technological and environmental complications of traditional microbots as they are self-powered, biodegradable, and biocompatible.

== Definitions ==
While the "micro" prefix has been used subjectively to mean "small", standardizing on length scales avoids confusion. Thus a nanorobot would have characteristic dimensions at or below 1 micrometer, or manipulate components on the 1 to 1000 nm size range such as the theoretical concepts developed by Robert Freitas. A microrobot would have characteristic dimensions less than 1 millimeter, a millirobot would have dimensions less than a cm, a mini-robot would have dimensions less than 10 cm (4 in), and a small robot would have dimensions less than 100 cm (39 in).

Many sources also describe robots larger than 1 millimeter as microbots or microrobots larger than 1 micrometer as nanobots.

== Design considerations ==
The way microrobots move around is a function of their purpose and necessary size. At submicron sizes, the physical world demands rather bizarre ways of getting around. The Reynolds number for airborne robots is less than unity; the viscous forces dominate the inertial forces, so "flying" could use the viscosity of air, rather than Bernoulli's principle of lift. Robots moving through fluids may require rotating flagella like the motile form of E. coli. Hopping is stealthy and energy-efficient; it allows the robot to negotiate the surfaces of a variety of terrains. Pioneering calculations (Solem 1994) examined possible behaviors based on physical realities.

One of the major challenges in developing a microrobot is to achieve motion using a very limited power supply. The microrobots can use a small lightweight battery source like a coin cell or can scavenge power from the surrounding environment in the form of vibration or light energy. Microrobots are also now using biological motors as power sources, such as flagellated Serratia marcescens, to draw chemical power from the surrounding fluid to actuate the robotic device. These biorobots can be directly controlled by stimuli such as chemotaxis or galvanotaxis with several control schemes available. A popular alternative to an onboard battery is to power the robots using externally induced power. Examples include the use of electromagnetic fields, ultrasound and light to activate and control micro robots.

The 2022 study focused on a photo-biocatalytic approach for the "design of light-driven microrobots with applications in microbiology and biomedicine".

Because individual microrobots have very little onboard computing power, coordinating large numbers of them has been proposed to rely on software-based control, including swarm intelligence, in which group behaviour emerges from simple local interaction rules rather than from central command. Similar decentralised approaches are already used to coordinate fleets of autonomous aerial drones, for example flocking algorithms tested on real quadcopter swarms and palm-sized drones that navigate cluttered forests as a group.

== Locomotion of microrobots ==
Microrobots employ various locomotion methods to navigate through different environments, from solid surfaces to fluids. These methods are often inspired by biological systems and are designed to be effective at the micro-scale. Several factors need to be maximized (precision, speed, stability), and others have to be minimized (energy consumption, energy loss) in the design and operation of microrobot locomotion in order to guarantee accurate, effective, and efficient movement.

When describing the locomotion of microrobots, several key parameters are used to characterize and evaluate their movement, including stride length and transportation costs. A stride refers to a complete cycle of movement that includes all the steps or phases necessary for an organism or robot to move forward by repeating a specific sequence of actions. Stride length (𝞴_{s}) is the distance covered by a microrobot in one complete cycle of its locomotion mechanism. Cost of transport (CoT) defines the work required to move a unit of mass of a microrobot a unit of distance

=== Surface locomotion ===
Microrobots that use surface locomotion can move in a variety of ways, including walking, crawling, rolling, or jumping. These microrobots meet different challenges, such as gravity and friction. One of the parameters describing surface locomotion is the Frounde number, defined as:

$Fr=\frac{v^2}{g*\lambda_s}$

Where v is motion speed, g is the gravitational field, and 𝞴s is a stride length. A microrobot demonstrating a low Froude number moves slower and more stable as gravitational forces dominate, while a high Froude number indicates that inertial forces are more significant, allowing faster and potentially less stable movement.

Crawling is one of the most typical surface locomotion types. The mechanisms employed by microrobots for crawling can differ but usually include the synchronized movement of multiple legs or appendages. The mechanism of the microrobots' movements is often inspired by animals such as insects, reptiles, and small mammals. An example of a crawling microrobot is RoBeetle. The autonomous microrobot weighs 88 milligrams (approximately the weight of three rice grains). The robot is powered by the catalytic combustion of methanol. The design relies on controllable NiTi-Pt–based catalytic artificial micromuscles with a mechanical control mechanism.

Other options for actuating microrobots' surface locomotion include magnetic, electromagnetic, piezoelectric, electrostatic, and optical actuation.

=== Swimming locomotion ===
Swimming microrobots are designed to operate in 3D through fluid environments, like biological fluids or water. To achieve effective movements, locomotion strategies are adopted from small aquatic animals or microorganisms, such as flagellar propulsion, pulling, chemical propulsion, jet propulsion, and tail undulation. Swimming microrobots, in order to move forward, must drive water backward.

Microrobots move in the low Reynolds number regime due to their small sizes and low operating speeds, as well as high viscosity of the fluids they navigate. At this level, viscous forces dominate over inertial forces. This requires a different approach in the design compared to swimming at the macroscale in order to achieve effective movements. The low Reynolds number also allows for accurate movements, which makes it good application in medicine, micro-manipulation tasks, and environmental monitoring.

Dominating viscous (Stokes) drag forces T_{drag} on the robot balances the propulsive force F_{p} generated by a swimming mechanism.

$T=T_(drag)=\frac{bv}{m}$

Where b is the viscous drag coefficient, v is motion speed, and m is the body mass.

One of the examples of a swimming microrobot is a helical magnetic microrobot consisting of a spiral tail and a magnetic head body. This design is inspired by the flagellar motion of bacteria. By applying a magnetic torque to a helical microrobot within a low-intensity rotating magnetic field, the rotation can be transformed into linear motion. This conversion is highly effective in low Reynolds number environments due to the unique helical structure of the microrobot. By altering the external magnetic field, the direction of the spiral microrobot's motion can be easily reversed.

=== At Air-Fluid Interface locomotion ===
In the specific instance when microrobots are at the air-fluid interface, they can take advantage of surface tension and forces provided by capillary motion. At the point where air and a liquid, most often water, come together, it is possible to establish an interface capable of supporting the weight of the microrobots through the work of surface tension. Cohesion between molecules of a liquid creates surface tension, which otherwise creates 'skin' over the water's surface, letting the microrobots float instead of sinking. Through such concepts, microrobots could perform specific locomotion functions, including climbing, walking, levitating, floating, and or even jumping, by exploring the characteristics of the air-fluid interface.

Due to the surface tension, σ, the buoyancy force, F_{b}, and the curvature force, F_{c}, play the most important roles, particularly in deciding whether the microrobot will float or sink on the surface of the liquid. This can be expressed as

$\sigma=F_b+F_c$

F_{b} is obtained by integrating the hydrostatic pressure over the area of the body in contact with the water. In contrast, F_{c} is obtained by integrating the curvature pressure over this area or, alternatively, the vertical component of the surface tension, $\sigma\sin\theta$, along the contact perimeter.

Microrobots can also navigate the air-fluid interface by exploiting local surface tension gradients. When gradients in surface tension are established (either thermally or chemically), fluid naturally flows from regions of lower to higher surface tension, an interfacial phenomenon known as the Marangoni effect. This flow can be harnessed for active propulsion and manipulation. For instance, light-controlled, laser-powered thermocapillary platforms can generate localized thermal gradients on a water surface to actuate and steer untethered microrobotic bodies, enabling the manipulation of floating micro-objects.

One example of a climbing, walking microrobot that utilizes air-fluid locomotion is the Harvard Ambulatory MicroRobot with Electroadhesion (HAMR-E). The control system of HAMR-E is developed to allow the robot to function in a flexible and maneuverable manner in a challenging environment. Its features include its ability to move on horizontal, vertical, and inverted planes, which is facilitated by the electro-adhesion system. This uses electric fields to create electrostatic attraction, causing the robot to stick and move on different surfaces. With four compliant and electro-adhesion footpads, HAMR-E can safely grasp and slide over various substrate types, including glass, wood, and metal. The robot has a slim body and is fully posable, making it easy to perform complex movements and balance on any surface.

=== Flying locomotion ===
Flying microrobots are miniature robotic systems meticulously engineered to operate in the air by emulating the flight mechanisms of insects and birds. These microrobots have to overcome the issues related to lift, thrust, and movement that are challenging to accomplish at such a small scale where most aerodynamic theories must be modified. Active flight is the most energy-intensive mode of locomotion, as the microrobot must lift its body weight while propelling itself forward. To achieve this function, these microrobots mimic the movement of insect wings and generate the necessary airflow for producing lift and thrust. Miniaturized wings of the robots are actuated with Piezoelectric materials, which offer better control of wing kinematics and flight dynamics.

To calculate the necessary aerodynamic power for maintaining a hover with flapping wings, the primary physical equation is expressed as

$mg=2*\rho*l^2*\phi*\upsilon_i^2$

where m is the body mass, L is the wing length, Φ represents the wing flapping amplitude in radians, ρ indicates the air density, and V_{i} corresponds to the induced air speed surrounding the body, a consequence of the wings' flapping and rotation movements. This equation illustrates that a small insect or robotic device must impart sufficient momentum to the surrounding air to counterbalance its own weight.

One example of a flying microrobot that utilizes flying locomotion is the RoboBee and DelFly Nimble, which, regarding flight dynamics, emulate bees and fruit flies, respectively. Harvard University invented the RoboBee, a miniature robot that mimics a bee fly, takes off and lands like one, and moves around confined spaces. It can be used in self-driving pollination and search operations for missing people and things. The DelFly Nimble, developed by the Delft University of Technology, is one of the most agile micro aerial vehicles that can mimic the maneuverability of a fruit fly by doing different tricks due to its minimal weight and advanced control mechanisms.

== Types and applications ==
Due to their small size, microbots are potentially very cheap, and could be used in large numbers (swarm robotics) to explore environments which are too small or too dangerous for people or larger robots. It is expected that microbots will be useful in applications such as looking for survivors in collapsed buildings after an earthquake or crawling through the digestive tract. What microbots lack in brawn or computational power, they can make up for by using large numbers, as in swarms of microbots. Bioinspired microrobots have emerged as a game-changing tool in the quest for precise drug delivery. These microscopic robots are designed to navigate the human body with a degree of precision previously unimaginable.

Potential applications with demonstrated prototypes include:

=== Medical microbots ===
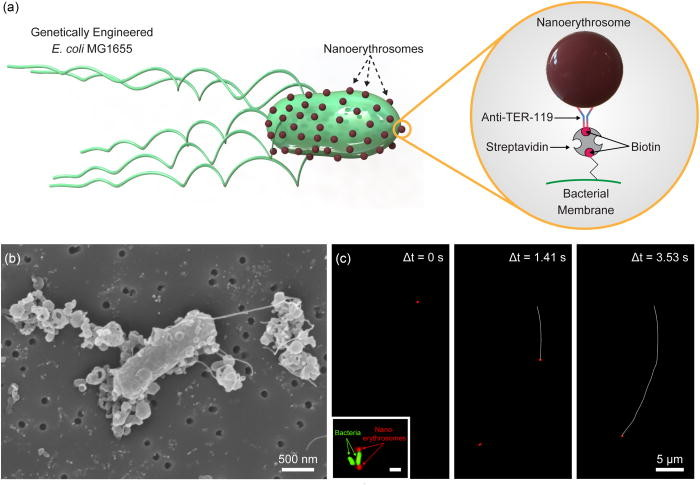
Biohybrid bacterial microswimmers

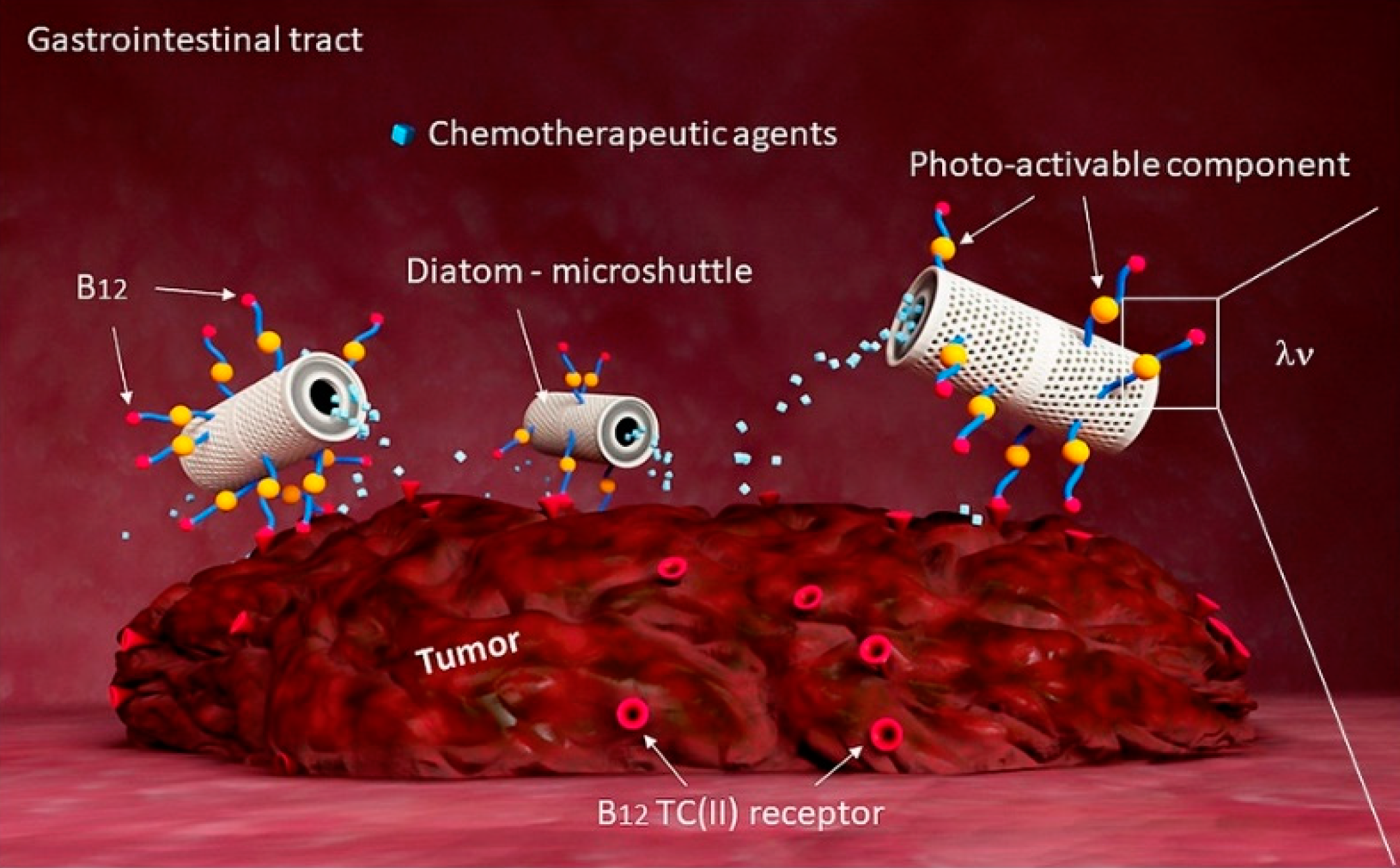
Biohybrid diatomite microswimmer drug delivery system Diatom frustule surface functionalised with photoactivable molecules (orange spheres) linked to vitamin B-12 (red sphere) acting as a tumor-targeting tag. The system can be loaded with chemotherapeutic drugs (light blue spheres), which can be selectively delivered to colorectal cancer cells. In addition, diatomite microparticles can be photoactivated to generate carbon monoxide or free radicals inducing tumor cell apoptosis.

Biohybrid microswimmers, mainly composed of integrated biological actuators and synthetic cargo carriers, have recently shown promise toward minimally invasive theranostic applications. Various microorganisms, including bacteria, microalgae, and spermatozoids, have been utilised to fabricate different biohybrid microswimmers with advanced medical functionalities, such as autonomous control with environmental stimuli for targeting, navigation through narrow gaps, and accumulation to necrotic regions of tumor environments. Steerability of the synthetic cargo carriers with long-range applied external fields, such as acoustic or magnetic fields, and intrinsic taxis behaviours of the biological actuators toward various environmental stimuli, such as chemoattractants, pH, and oxygen, make biohybrid microswimmers a promising candidate for a broad range of medical active cargo delivery applications.

For example, there are biocompatible microalgae-based microrobots for active drug-delivery in the brain, lungs and the gastrointestinal tract, and magnetically guided engineered bacterial microbots for 'precision targeting' for fighting cancer that all have been tested with mice.

== See also ==
- Artificial intelligence
- Claytronics
- Microswimmer
  - Biohybrid microswimmer
- Nanobiotechnology#Nanomedicine
