= Lynne Billard =

Australian statistician and academic

- Born: 1943 (age 82–83)
- Education: University of New South Wales
- Known for: Symbolic data analysis, Time series analysis, Statistical inference, Sequential analysis, Stochastic processes, Epidemic theory including AIDS research.
- Scientific career
- Fields: Statistics
- Workplaces: University of Georgia
- Thesis: Sequential Tests for Two-Sided Alternative Hypotheses

Lynne Billard (born 1943) is an Australian statistician and professor at the University of Georgia, known for her statistics research, leadership, and advocacy for women in science. She has served as president of the American Statistical Association, and the International Biometric Society, one of a handful of people to have led both organizations.

== Education ==
She earned her Bachelor of Science degree in 1966, and Doctoral degree in 1969, both from the University of New South Wales, Australia.

- Mathematics Cadetship, University of New South Wales, 1962-1965.
- Theory of Statistics II Prize, University of New South Wales, 1964.
- Theory of Statistics III Prize, University of New South Wales, 1965.
- General Proficiency in Statistics Prize, University of New South Wales, 1965.
- First Class Honours in Statistics, University of New South Wales, 1966.

== Life and career ==
In 1975, Billard joined Florida State University, USA as an Associate Professor and in 1980, she moved to the University of Georgia as head of the Department of Statistics and Computer Science. In 1984, when the departments split, she became the first Head of the Department of Statistics at UGA. From 1989 - 1991, she served as an Associate Dean at the University of Georgia, in 1992 she was named a University Professor. Among her other appointments are the following:

1. Teaching Fellow and Tutor, University of New South Wales, 1/1966-12/1968.
2. Lecturer, University of Birmingham, U. K., 1/1969-12/1970.
3. Visiting Assistant Professor, SUNY at Buffalo, 1/1971-8/1971.
4. Assistant Professor, University of Waterloo, Canada, 9/1971-12/1974.
5. Visiting Assistant Professor, Stanford University, 1/1974-8/1974.
6. Visiting Associate Professor, SUNY at Buffalo, 9/1974-6/1975.
7. Visiting Associate Professor, Stanford University, 6/1974-8/1974.
8. Associate Professor, Florida State University, 7/1975-8/1980.
9. Associate Head, Florida State University, 7/1976-6/1978.
10. Research Fellow, Naval Postgraduate School, 8/1979-9/1979.
11. Research Fellow, University of California, Berkeley, 9/1979-12/1979.
12. Professor, Florida State University, 1980-1981, on leave (at University of Georgia).
13. Professor of Statistics and Head, Department of Computer Science and Statistics, University of Georgia, 9/1980-8/1984.
14. Professor and Head, Statistics, University of Georgia, 9/1984-3/1989.
15. Imperial College, London (on leave), 9/1986-12/1986.
16. Professor and Associate Dean, University of Georgia, 4/1989-8/1991.
17. Professor, University of Georgia, 9/1991-6/1992.
18. University Professor, University of Georgia, 7/1992–present.
19. Adjunct Professor, Australian National University, 7/1997–present.
20. Honorary Professorial Fellow, University of Melbourne, 9/2009–present.

== Research ==
Lynne Billard has worked to involve statisticians in solving current and applied problems. Her work on the incubation period of AIDS greatly impacted public health education. Overall, her research spans a mix of theoretical and applied work. Most mathematical/theoretical work was motivated by real life applied questions primarily from the biological sciences (broadly defined), including scientific collaboration with substantive field researchers. The emphasis has changed over the years, with frequent returns to former areas. For example, early work focused on epidemic processes. Currently, a large manuscript (44 pages) on the impact of HIV-AIDS on health-care and insurance premiums has been submitted for publication. Also, currently, an analysis of survival rates using a cardiology dataset (with large n and large p) is being finalized; this analysis develops and then applies symbolic classification methods for interval and modal data formats for acute myocardial infarction and compares the results with those from classical CART and ecological CART analyses.

1. Epidemic theory including AIDS research.
2. Stochastic processes, with emphasis on model building
3. Sequential analysis, with emphasis on hypothesis testing.
4. Statistical inference, with emphasis on estimation theory.
5. Time series analysis.
6. Symbolic data analysis.

=== Books ===
1. Computer Science and Statistics: Proceedings of the Sixteenth Symposium on the Interface (editor). 1985. North Holland Publishers.
2. AIDS Sexual Behavior and Intravenous Drug Use (with Co-National Research Council Panel Members). 1989. National Academy Press.
3. Improving Information for Social Policy Decisions: The Uses of Microsimulation Modeling, Volume I (with Co-National Research Council Panel Members). 1991. National Academy Press.
4. Improving Information for Social Policy Decisions: The Uses of Microsimulation Modeling, Volume II (with Co-National Research Council Panel Members). 1991. National Academy Press.
5. Exploring the Limits of Bootstrap (ed., with R. LePage). 1992. John Wiley.
6. Case Studies in Biometry (eds. N. Lange, L. Ryan, L. Billard, D. Brillinger, L. Conquest and J. Greenhouse). 1994. John Wiley.
7. Computer Science and Statistics: Proceedings of the Twenty-Eighth Symposium on the Interface (ed. with N. Fisher). 1997. Interface Foundation Publisher.
8. Lynne Billard, Edwin Diday, "Symbolic Data Analysis: Conceptual Statistics and Data Mining," Volume 654 of Wiley Series in Computational Statistics, John Wiley & Sons, 2012.

== Awards and honors ==
She served as president of the two largest statistical societies in the world: the International Biometric Society (1994 - 1995) and the American Statistical Association (1995 - 1996). She is only the third person to have been president of both organizations. She also served as principal investigator for "Pathways to the Future," an annual National Science Foundation workshop which ran from 1988 to 2004 and focused on mentoring women who had recently received PhDs in Statistics, and were primarily entering academic positions.

In 2011, she received the tenth annual Janet L. Norwood Award for Outstanding Achievement by a Woman in the Statistical Sciences. In 2013, she was awarded the Florence Nightingale David Award by the Committee of Presidents of Statistical Societies, which is given biannually recognizes a female statistician for exemplary contributions to education, science and public service.

Here is a list of her notable awards.

1. Fellow of the American Statistical Association, 1980
2. Elected member of the International Statistical Institute
3. Fellow of the Institute of Mathematical Statistics
4. American Statistical Association 1990 Award for Outstanding Statistical Application paper.
5. University Professor, University of Georgia, effective from July 1992. (University Professorship in recognition of outstanding service and contributions to the university outside of scholarship).
6. Creative Research Medal, University of Georgia, 1992.
7. International President, International Biometric Society, 1994, 1995.
8. President, American Statistical Association, 1996.
9. Women's Studies Faculty Award, University of Georgia (First award) 1999.
10. American Statistical Association 1999 Samuel Wilks Award.
11. University of New South Wales 1999 Alumni Award.
12. American Statistical Association 2003 Founders Award.
13. COPSS 2008 Elizabeth Scott Award.
14. University of New South Wales 2009, one of 60 featured alumni from 1949-2009.
15. Janet L. Norwood Award 2011.
16. COPSS 2013 F.N. David Award.

== Selected publications ==
- The Past, Present, and Future of Academic Women in the Mathematical Sciences
