= Soft key =

Programmable button

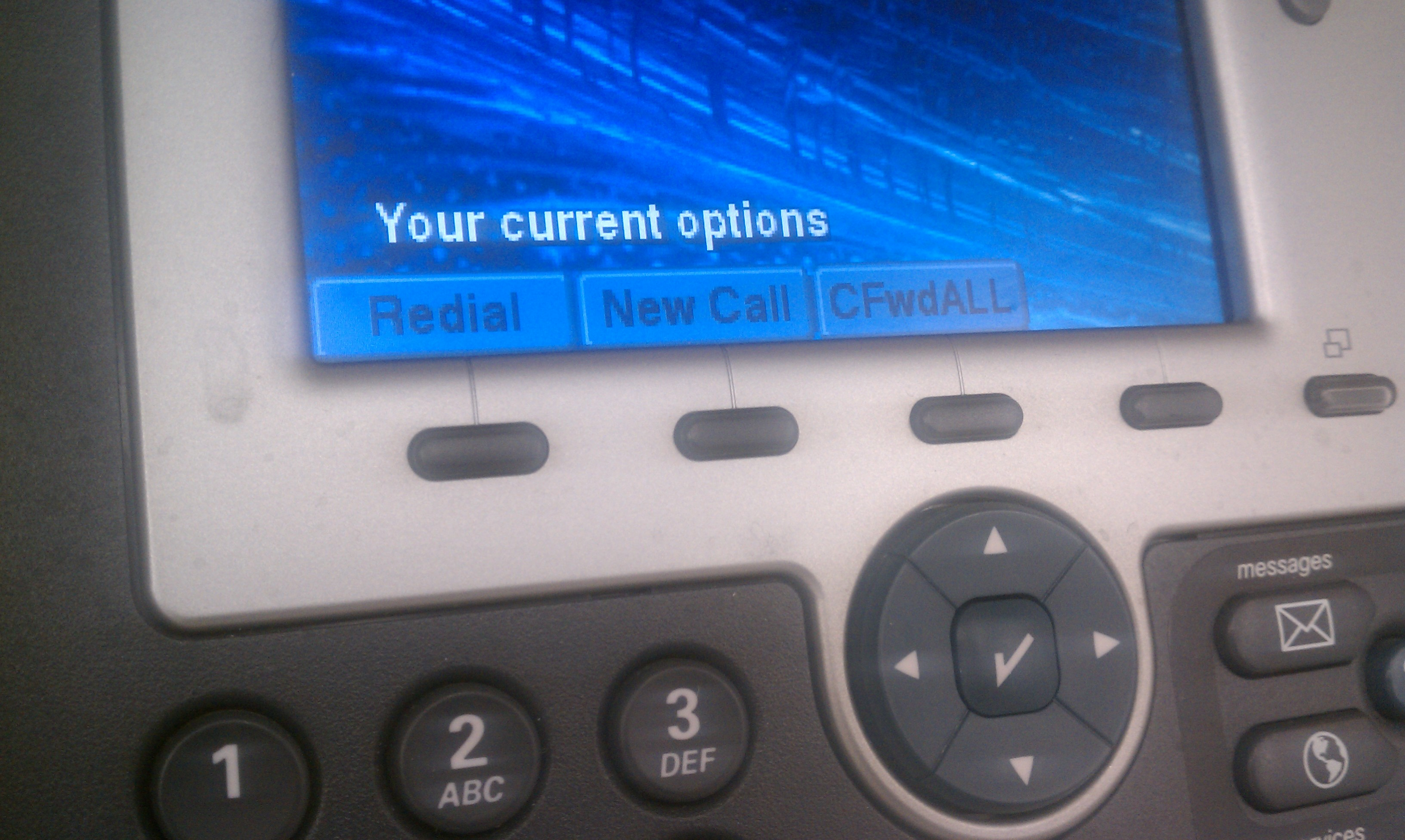
Screen-labeled function keys on a VoIP phone, allowing 'Redial', 'New Call', and 'CFwdALL'.

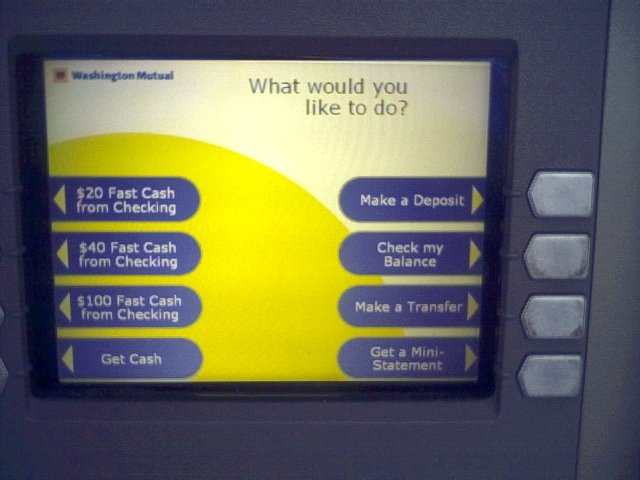
ATM display and half of its screen-labeled function keys

A soft key is a button flexibly programmable to invoke any of a number of functions rather than being associated with a single fixed function or a fixed set of functions. A softkey often takes the form of a screen-labeled function key located alongside a display device, where the button invokes a function described by the text at that moment shown adjacent to the button on the display. Soft keys are also found away from the display device, for example on the sides of cellular phones, where they are typically programmed to invoke functions such as PTT, memo, or volume control. Function keys on computer keyboards are a form of soft key. In contrast, a hard key is a key with dedicated function such as the keys on a number keypad.

Screen-labeled function keys are today most commonly found in kiosk applications, such as automated teller machines and gas pumps. Screen-label function keys date to aviation applications in the late 1960s. Kiosk applications were particularly common in the 1990s and 2000s. Screen-labeled function keys are found in automotive and aviation applications such as in the primary flight and multi-function displays. An alternative to screen-labeled function keys is a touchscreen showing a graphical user interface where the labels are buttons (virtual keys) that can be pressed directly. The increased prevalence of touchscreens in the 2000s has led to a decrease in screen-labeled function keys. However, screen-labeled function keys are inexpensive and robust, and provide tactile feedback.

== History ==
Function keys on a BBC Micro's keyboard; a paper strip with commands for Elite has been inserted under the transparent cover for labels.

Early examples are found in aviation glass cockpits, such as the Mark II avionics of the F-111D in the late 1960s/early 1970s (first ordered 1967, delivered 1970–73). Hewlett-Packard developed them for use in computers/calculators in the 1970s. The HP 9830 desktop computer was the first calculator with two rows of 4 keys, over which a paper overlay would be placed. These were later adapted to terminals. Programmers found that the HP 2640 terminals could lock the top two lines of the screen, so they displayed the key functions there. Starting with HP 2647 terminal, the keys were re-arranged to correspond with 2 pairs of 4 labels at the bottom of the screen. These could be programmed by escape sequence or configuration screen. This would be further developed on the failed HP 300 Amigo, which used keys at the right side of the screen and HP 250 business computers which placed them at the bottom. By arranging functions in hierarchical trees, many functions can be implemented with only 8 keys.

== Graphical calculators ==
As of 2008, HP calculators use this arrangement to implement hierarchical trees of functions. They are rarely found on PC applications, even though the first IBM PC BASIC labeled function key use at the bottom of the screen, and there were 12 function keys, patterned after use on IBM terminals.

Modern Texas Instruments calculators such as the TI-89 series use function keys to open drop-down menus on their menu bar, the menu title acting like the key label.

Casio calculators use the function keys for a menu at the bottom of the screen.

== Mobile phone ==
A typical mobile phone with soft keys has them located beneath the bottom left and bottom right of the display; some, especially those made by Nokia, have an additional center soft key, activated by pressing on the center of the directional pad. Depending on the modality of the application, various functions can be mapped onto it. It can also bring up multiple functions listed on a pop-up expanded menu. Usually the prompt text on the display for the softkey is not allowed to be truncated or omitted with ellipsis. The softkey itself is usually not printed with a functional icon or text, but is often marked with a dot or short bar.

Soft keys have become increasingly rare as touchscreens take the place of function keys on many modern smartphones.

== Point of sale ==
Screen-labeled function keys have found use in point of sale systems; NCR Corporation claims that their DynaKey system "has been proven to reduce training time and cashier errors".
