= HP 250 =

Computer by Hewlett-Packard

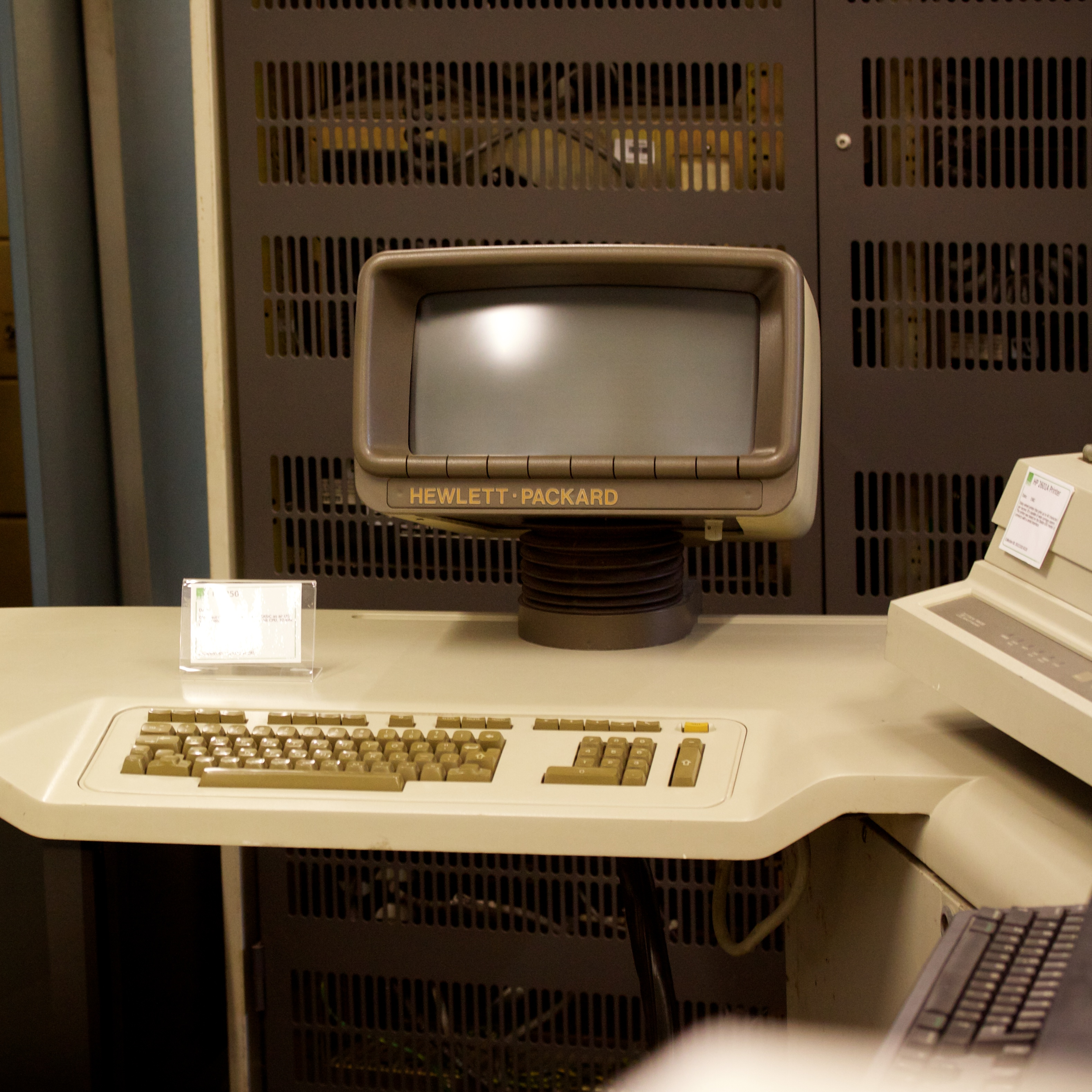
- Developer: Hewlett-Packard
- Released: 1978
- Introductory price: $24,500 USD
- Discontinued: 1st Jan 1986
- Units sold: 7000
- Operating system: HP BASIC
- Predecessor: HP 9835
- Successor: HP 260

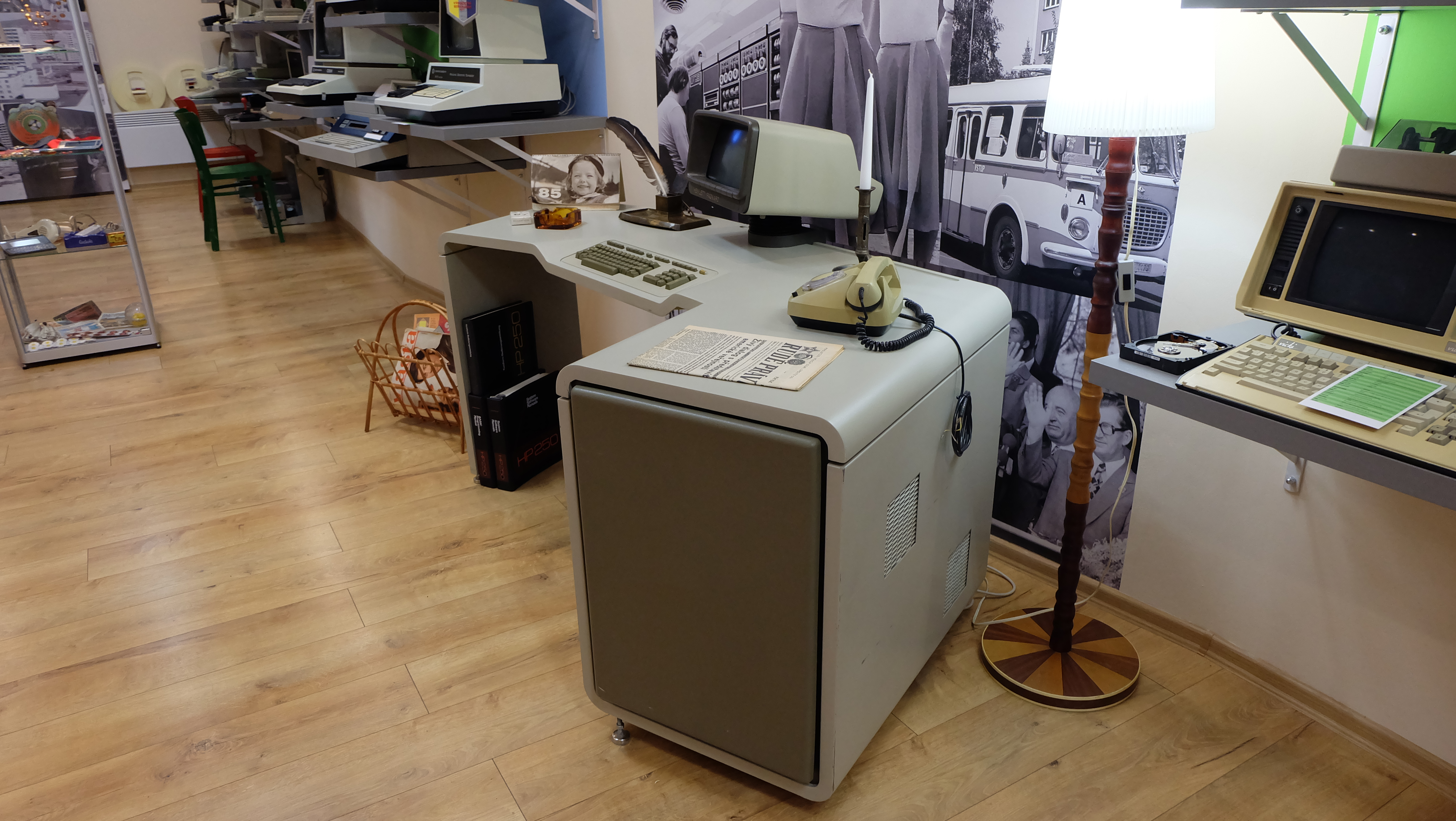
Hewlett Packard 250

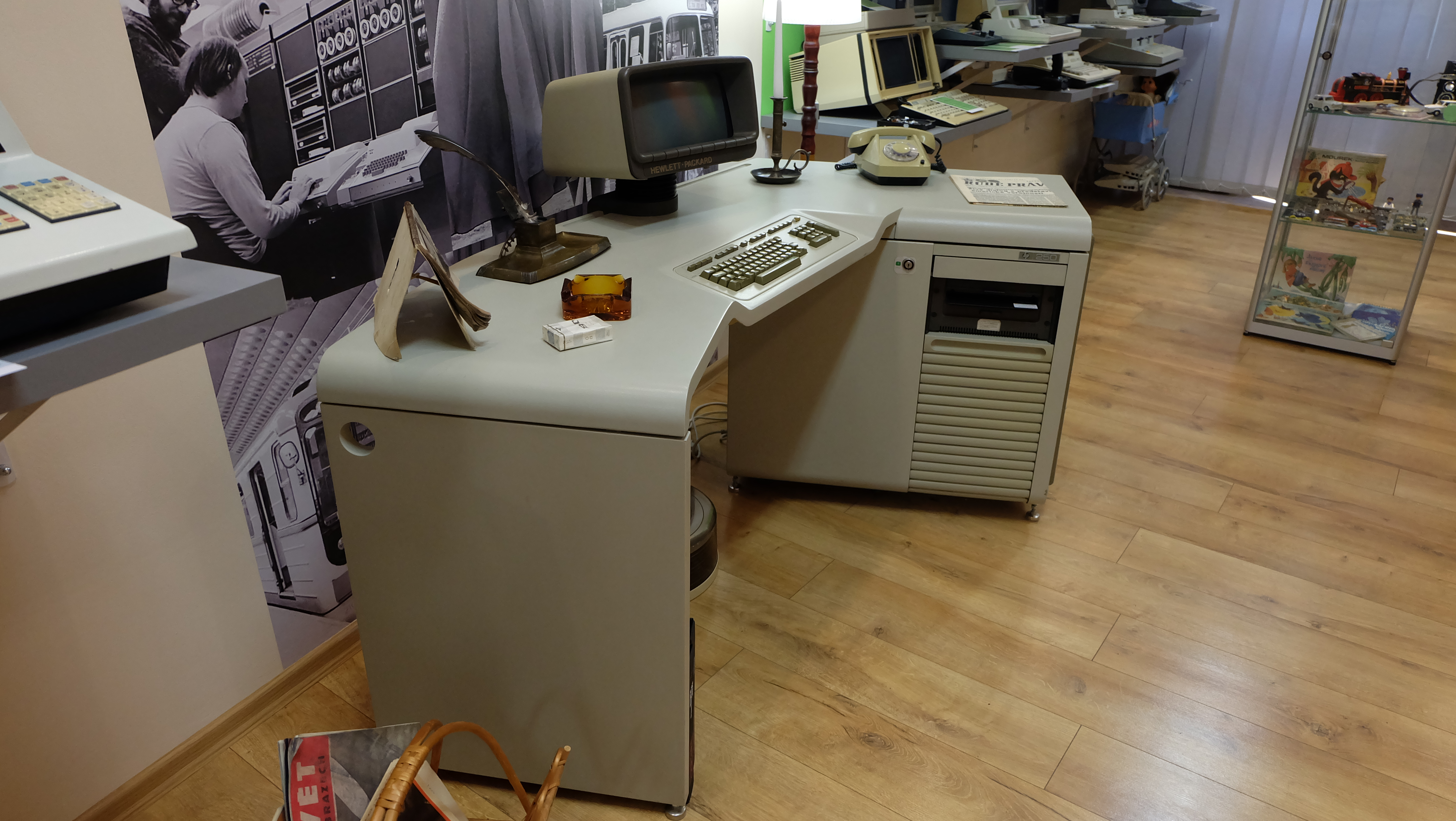
Hewlett Packard 250

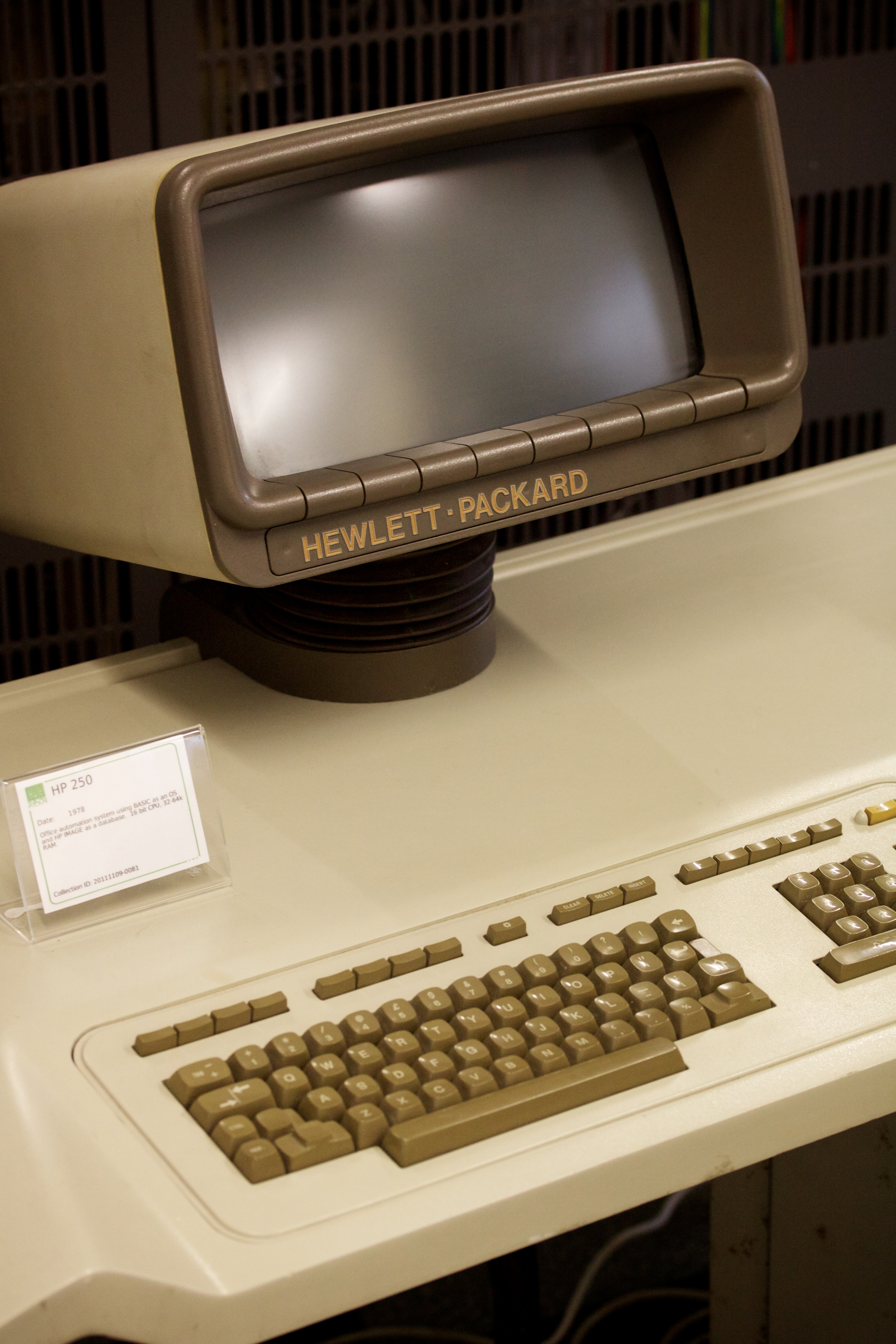
Closeup of HP 250 keyboard and monitor

The HP 250 was a multiuser business computer by Hewlett-Packard running HP 250 BASIC language as its OS with access to HP's IMAGE database management. It was produced by the General Systems Division (GSD), but was a major repackaging of desktop workstation HP 9835 from the HP 9800 series which had been sold in small business configurations. The HP 9835's processor was initially used in the first HP 250s.

The HP 250 borrowed the embedded keyboard design from the HP 300 and added a wider slide-able and tilt-able monitor with screen labeled function keys buttons physically placed just below on-screen labels (a configuration now used in ATMs and gas pumps) built into a large desk design.

Though the HP 250 had a different processor and operating system, it used similar interface cards to the HP 300, and then later also the HP 3000 models 30, 33, 40, 42, 44, and 48: HP-IB channel (GIC), Network, and serial (MUX) cards. Usually the HP250 was a small HP-IB single channel system (limited to seven HP-IB devices per GIC at a less than 1 MHz bandwidth).

Initially the HP 250 was like the HP300 as a single user, floppy based computer system. Later a multi-user ability was added, and the HP300's embedded hard drive was installed as a boot drive. Additionally, drivers were made available to connect and use more HP-IB devices: hard disc and tape drives, plus impact and matrix printers. This gave some business-growth scale-ability to the HP250 product line.

The HP 250 was advertised in 1978 and was promoted more in Europe as an easy-to-use, small space, low cost business system, and thus sold better in Europe. Later publicity emphasised the usability of the system for employees with only minimal training. The next-gen HP 250 was the HP 260 which lost the table, embedded keyboard, and CRT for a small stand-alone box.

HP systems moved away from all-in-one table top designs to having the system in a remote secure location, and remotely connecting user's terminals and peripherals out to in their work area. In those days, RS-232 cables ran from desk side terminals (262x low cost terminals) to the HP 250 via a MUX card. Speeds of 9600 baud were common (pre- LAN / network cards to PCs).

== See also ==
- HP Roman Extension Set
