= Bit-paired keyboard =

Keyboard layout

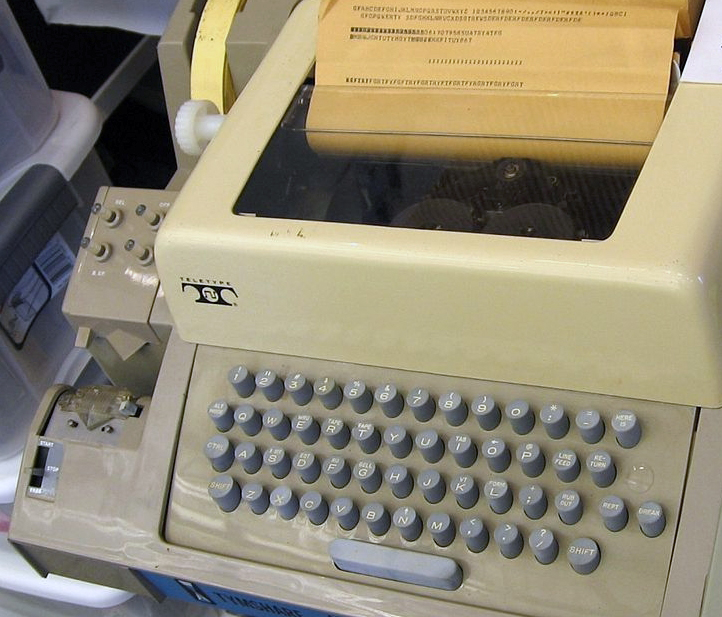
Teletype Model 33 (1963) keyboard, seminal bit-paired keyboard

A bit-paired keyboard is a keyboard where the layout of shifted keys corresponds to columns in the ASCII (1963) table, archetypally the Teletype Model 33 (1963) keyboard. This was later contrasted with a typewriter-paired keyboard, where the layout of shifted keys corresponds to electric typewriter layouts, notably the IBM Selectric (1961). The difference is most visible in the digits row (top row): compared with mechanical typewriters, bit-paired keyboards remove the _ character from 6 and shift the remaining &*() from 7890 to 6789, while typewriter-paired keyboards replace 3 characters: ⇧ Shift+2 from " to @ ⇧ Shift+6 from _ to ^ and ⇧ Shift+8 from ' to *. An important subtlety is that ASCII was based on mechanical typewriters, but electric typewriters became popular during the same period that ASCII was adopted, and made their own changes to layout. Thus differences between bit-paired and (electric) typewriter-paired keyboards are due to the differences of both of these from earlier mechanical typewriters.

Bit-paired keyboards were common in the United States in the 1960s and 1970s, due to ease of manufacture, but died out in the late 1970s with office automation, due to the number of users already accustomed to (electric) typewriter layouts. Bit-paired keyboard layouts survive today only in the standard Japanese keyboard layout, which has all shifted values of digits in the bit-paired layout.

== Technical details ==
=== Background ===
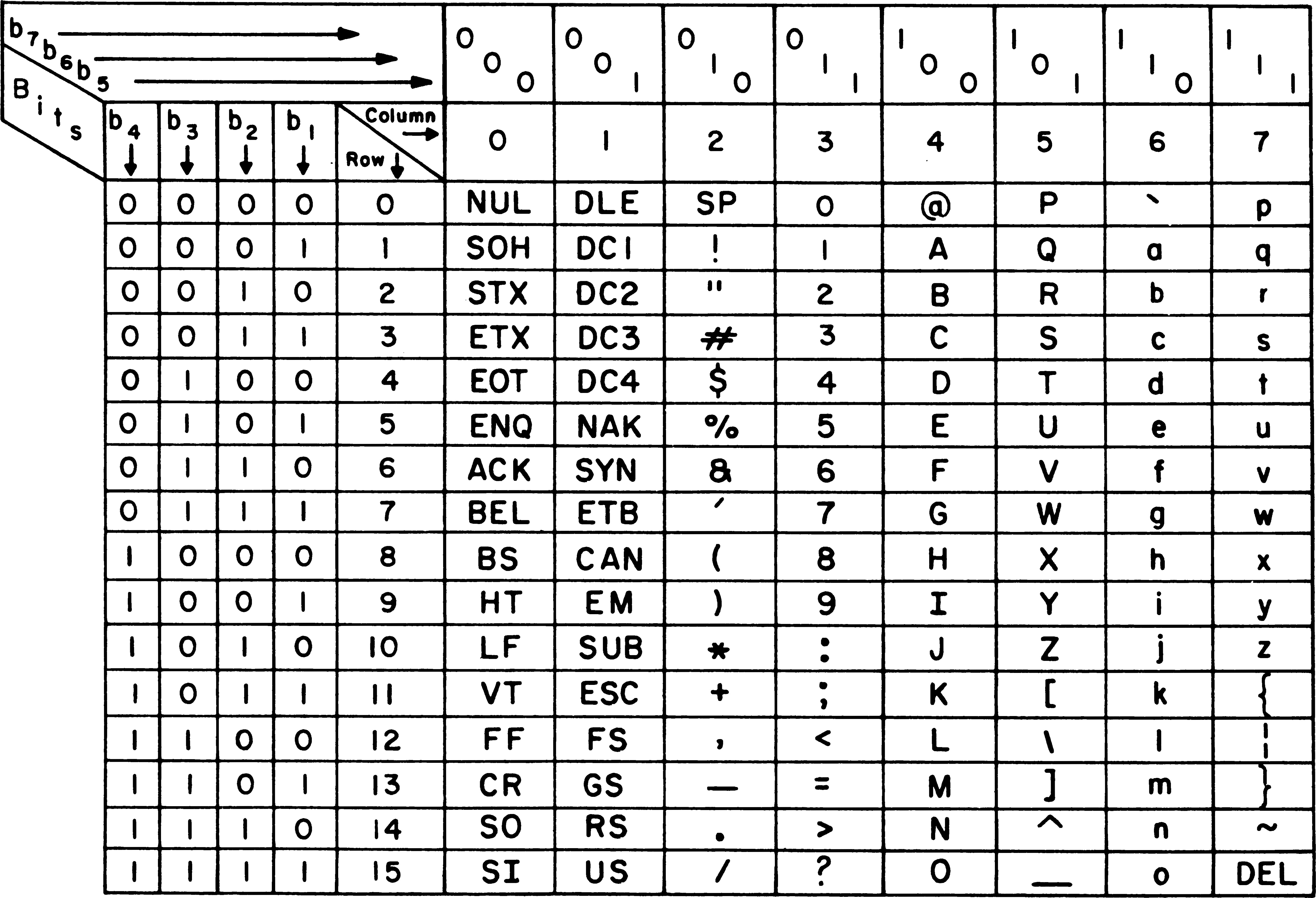
ASCII table: in bit-paired keyboards, shift corresponds to changing columns.

In mechanical typewriters, the shift key functions by mechanically shifting some component so an alternate row of characters on typebars hits the paper. In an electronic system, by contrast, there is no necessary connection between the code points of unshifted and shifted values, though implementation is simpler if the code points of unshifted and shifted keys are related, most simply by a single bit differing. In electromechanical systems, this makes a significant difference in ease of implementation, as shifting must be accomplished by some physical linkage.

For this reason, among others (such as ease of collation), the ASCII standard strove to organize the code points so that shifting could be implemented by simply toggling a bit. This is most conspicuous in uppercase and lowercase characters: uppercase characters are in columns 4 (100) and 5 (101), while the corresponding lowercase characters are in columns 6 (110) and 7 (111), requiring only toggling the 6th bit (2nd high bit) to switch case; as there are only 26 letters, the remaining 6 points in each column were occupied by symbols or, in one case, a control character (DEL, in 127).

This is also present, but less precisely, in the organization of digits and symbols in columns 2 (010) and 3 (011) – this discrepancy is the source of bit-paired layouts. Ideally the characters would have been ordered so that unshifted and shifted values of a typewriter key were in adjacent columns, allowing shifting to be implemented by toggling the 5th bit (1st high bit). Due to other concerns, this correspondence is inexact: for example, SP (Space) and 0 (zero) both have low bits 00000 (to ease collation for space and conversion to/from binary-coded decimal for 0), preventing 0 from lining up with ) (right parenthesis), its conventional value, and thus instead () corresponded to 89, instead of 90 as on typewriters. Further, while digits were placed in column 3, the characters ,-./ (conventionally unshifted) were placed in column 2, to ease collation, due to being used as separators, and the characters ;: (conventionally paired) were both placed in column 3. Other symbols also did not line up with their conventional digit pair, as detailed below.

As a result, implementing an electromechanical keyboard that produced an ASCII encoding but had conventional typewriter key mappings would require significant complexity due to key-specific shift mechanisms for digits and symbol keys. This could be avoided by changing the key mappings to correspond to the ASCII table, which was notably done in the Teletype Model 33 (1963). Later keyboards continued to use this mapping, which was formalized in the American Standards Association X4.14-1971 standard and the European Computer Manufacturers' Association ECMA-23 standard, where it is referred to as logical bit pairing, and contrasted with typewriter pairing. In everyday usage these were referred to as bit-paired and typewriter-paired keyboards.

=== Mapping ===
The most conspicuous feature of a bit-paired keyboard are the shifted values of the digits, which are (only 9 values, 0 being unpaired):

!"#$%&'()

…instead of the conventional mechanical typewriter-paired values of:

!"#$%_&'()

…and the electric typewriter-paired values of:

!@#$%^&*()

The shifted values of digits in a bit-paired keyboard thus differ from mechanical typewriters only in omitting _ and shifting the remaining characters left. Electric typewriters differ in replacing " with @, _ with ^, and ' with *. This is because smaller characters hit the paper with less force, and consolidating smaller characters such as '" and -_ into a pair on a single key avoided needing to adjust the force based on shift state.

Overall this results in the following comparison between bit-paired keyboards and (electric) typewriter-paired keyboards: they agree in 1, 3, 4, 5, and differ in 2, 6, 7, 8, 9, 0: bit-pairing replaces @ with " (position 2), removes ^ (position 6, shifting later characters left), and replaces * with ' (position 8/7); there is also no shifted value for 0, as this corresponds to space, which is covered by the space bar. This corresponds in the ASCII table to the following columns (displayed as rows here):

high  low bits
bits  0000 0001 0010 0011 0100 0101 0110 0111 1000 1001
 010        !    "    #    $    %    &    '    (    )
 011   0    1    2    3    4    5    6    7    8    9

There are also less conspicuous differences in the symbol keys: bit-paired and typewriter-paired keyboards agree on ^{<}_{,}^{>}_{.}^{?}_{/} (rows 12, 14, and 15) but bit-paired keyboards have ^{*}_{:}^{+}_{;}^{=}_{-} (rows 10, 11, and 13) instead of ^{:}_{;}^{+}_{=}^{_}_{-} and are missing the '" key, as these are shifted values of digits.

This is the complete set of symbols on the Model 33; it is notably missing @`[{\|]}^~_ though these are present on other bit-paired keyboards. On both bit-paired and typewriter-paired keyboards, ^{{}_{[}^{|}_{\}^{}}_{]} are paired (rows 11, 12, and 13), but on bit-paired keyboards ^{`}_{@}^{~}_{^} are paired and _ is an unpaired key, while on typewriter-paired keyboards @ and ^ are shifted digits, while ^{~}_{`} are paired and _ is paired with -.

== Legacy ==
In the US, bit-paired keyboards continued to be used into the 1970s, including on electronic keyboards like the HP 2640 terminal (1975) and the first model Apple II computer (1977). They died out in the late 1970s, due to the influx of users accustomed to electric typewriters, and were not included in the successor to the X4.14-1971 standard, X4.23-1982. No later common American layout uses bit-pairing. A typewriter-paired layout similar to the IBM Selectric's was used in the DEC VT52 (1975), the IBM PC (1981), and the Model M keyboard (1984). Other personal computers imitated it, resulting in the typewriter-paired layout becoming standard in the US, and to a lesser extent globally.

In the UK, bit-paired keyboards were used on most 8-bit computers such as the Acorn BBC computers and the earlier Atom and Systems, the Amstrad CPC series, and (to an extent) the ZX Spectrum.

In Europe, keyboards of computers for text processing underwent the transition to national typewriter layouts in the late 1970s, but otherwise the international bit-paired layout of ISO 2530 (1975) remained in use until general-purpose PC keyboards replaced the device-specific ones in the late 1980s.

However, bit-pairing spread to countries that did not have as strong a tradition of typewriters but who adopted computers in the 1970s or early 1980s. It was found in the Japanese keyboard layout, the Turkish F-keyboard, and the Russian JCUKEN (Latin) layout. Of these, only the Japanese remains in use; the Turkish layout was replaced by QWERTY with typewriter-paired keys, while the JCUKEN (Latin) was replaced by Cyrillic layouts.

The influence of the Selectric layout was incomplete, however, and many layouts use the earlier 2" pairing, including UK layout and the Russian JCUKEN Cyrillic layout.
