= Multi-function display =

Small screen surrounded by multiple soft keys

A schematic example of a multi-function display

MFDs in the cockpit of an OH-1 helicopter (center right)

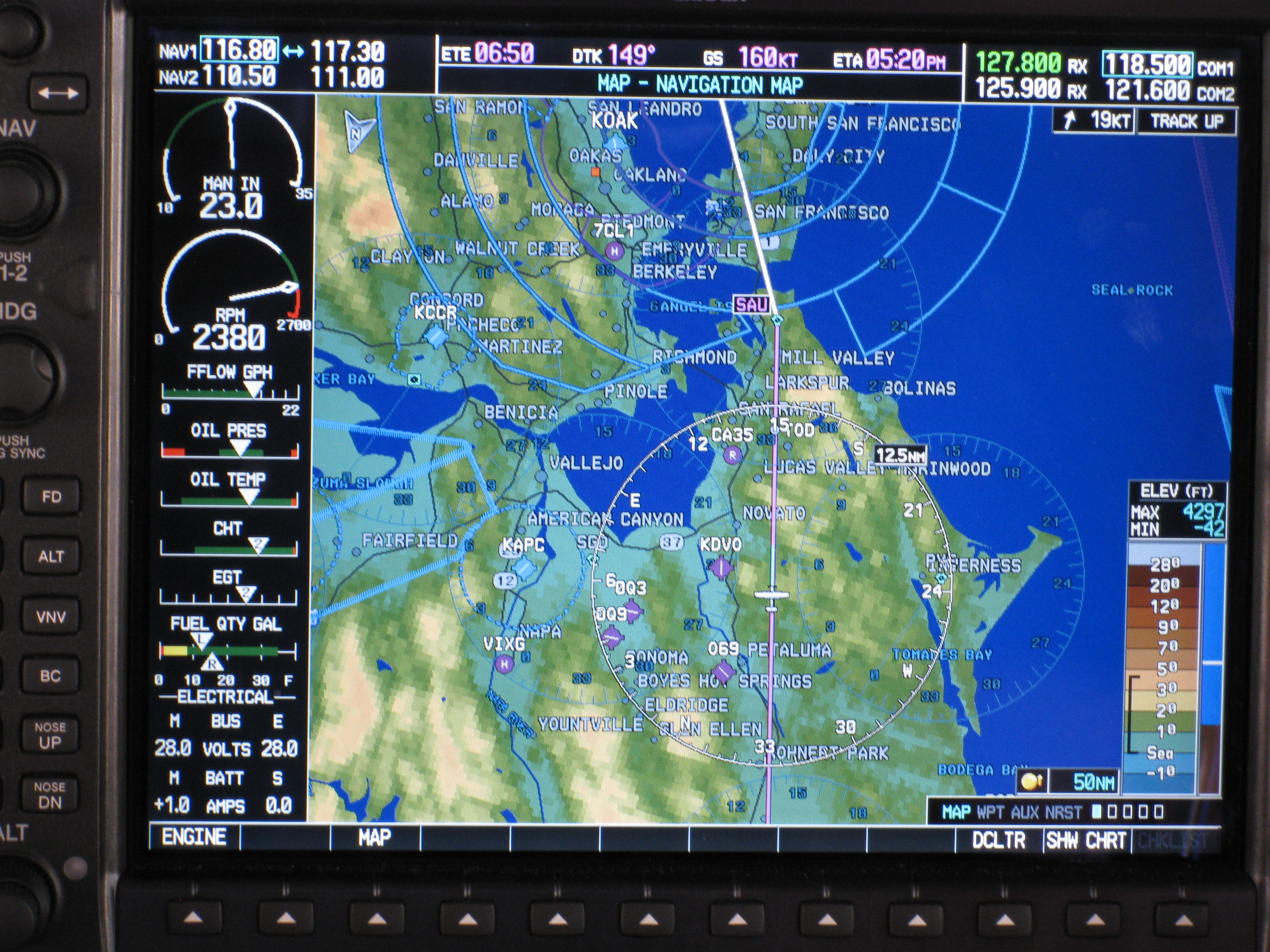
The MFD of a Garmin 1000 system, currently showing engine instruments (left column) and a navigational map; a row of soft keys is visible below the screen

A multifunction display (MFD) is a small-screen (CRT or LCD) surrounded by multiple soft keys (configurable buttons) that can be used to display information to the user in numerous configurable ways. MFDs originated in aviation, first in military aircraft, and later were adopted by commercial aircraft, general aviation, automotive use, motorsports use, and shipboard use.

== MFDs in aviation ==
Often, an MFD will be used in concert with a primary flight display (PFD), and forms a component of a glass cockpit. MFDs are part of the digital era of modern planes or helicopter. The first MFDs were introduced by air forces in the late 1960s and early 1970s; an early example is the F-111D (first ordered in 1967, delivered from 1970–73). The advantage of an MFD over analog display is that an MFD does not consume much space in the cockpit, as data can be presented in multiple pages, rather than always being present at once. For example, the cockpit of RAH-66 "Comanche" does not have analog dials or gauges at all. All information is displayed on the MFD pages. The possible MFD pages could differ for every plane, complementing their abilities (in combat).

Many MFDs allow pilots to display their navigation route, moving map, weather radar, NEXRAD, ground proximity warning system, traffic collision avoidance system, and airport information all on the same screen.

MFDs were added to the Space Shuttle (as the glass cockpit) starting in 1998, replacing the analog instruments and CRTs. The information being displayed is similar, and the glass cockpit was first flown on the STS-101 mission. Although many corporate business jets had them in years prior, the piston-powered Cirrus SR20 became the first part-23 certified aircraft to be delivered with an MFD in 1999 (and one of the first general aviation aircraft with a 10-in, flat-panel screen), followed closely by the Columbia 300 in 2000 and many others in the ensuing years.

In modern automotive technology, MFDs are used in cars to display navigation, entertainment, and vehicle status information.

== See also ==
- Index of aviation articles
- Acronyms and abbreviations in avionics
- Primary flight display
