= Help key =

Dedicated key on a computer keyboard

A Help key, found in the shape of a dedicated key explicitly labeled Help, or as another key, typically one of the function keys, on a computer keyboard, is a key which, when pressed, produces information on the screen/display to aid the user in their current task, such as using a specific function in an application program.

In the case of a non-dedicated Help key, the location of the key will sometimes vary between different software packages. Most common in computer history, however, is the development of a de facto Help key location for each brand/family of computer, exemplified by the use of F1 on IBM compatible PCs.

== Apple keyboards ==
The standard help key on the Apple IIe and Apple III series computers is either OPEN-APPLE-? or SOLID-APPLE-? ... The standard help key on the Apple II and Apple II+, where practical, is a question mark or slash, or else ESCAPE ? or ESCAPE /.

— A 1982 Apple Computer manual for developers.

On a full-sized Apple keyboard, the help key was labelled simply as Help, located to the left of the Home. Where IBM compatible PC keyboards had the Insert, Apple keyboards had the help key instead. As of 2007, new Apple keyboards do not have a help key. In its place, a full-sized Apple keyboard has a Fn instead. Instead of a mechanical help key, the menu bar for most applications contain a Help menu as a matter of convention.

== Commodore and Amiga keyboards ==
The Commodore 128 had a Help key in the second block of top row keys. Amiga keyboards had a Help key, labelled as such, above the arrow keys on the keyboard, and next to a Del key (where the Insert Home Pg Up cluster is on a standard PC keyboard).

== Atari keyboards ==
The keyboards of the Atari 16- and 32-bit computers had a Help key above the arrow keys on the keyboard. Atari 8-bit XL and XE series keyboards had dedicated Help keys, but in the group of differently-styled system keys separated from the rest of the keyboard.

== Sun Microsystems (Oracle) ==
Most of the Sun Microsystems keyboards have a dedicated "Help" key in the left top corner (left from the "Esc" key above block of 10 (Stop,Again,Props,Undo,Front,Copy,Open,Paste,Find,Cut) extra keys.
