= Scratch drive actuator =

Microelectromechanical system device

Scratch Drive Actuator

A scratch drive actuator (SDA) is a microelectromechanical system device that converts electrical energy into one-dimensional motion.

== Description ==
The actuator component can come in many shapes and sizes, depending on the fabrication method used. It can be visualised as an 'L'. The smaller end is called the 'bushing'.

The actuator sits on top of a substrate that has a thin insulating dielectric layer on top. A voltage is applied between the actuator and the substrate, and the resulting potential pulls the body of the actuator downwards. When this occurs, the brush is pushed forwards by a small amount, and energy is stored in the strained actuator. When the voltage is removed, the actuator springs back into shape while the bushing remains in its new position. By applying a pulsed voltage, the SDA can be made to move forward.

The voltage is usually applied to the actuator by means of a 'tether'. This can consist of a rigid connector or a rail which the SDA follows.

The size of an SDA is typically measured on the μm scale.
