= HP 300 =

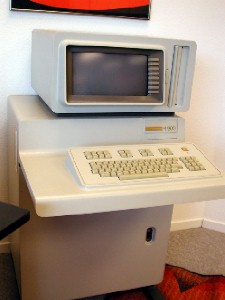
HP 300 Amigo Computer

The HP 300 "Amigo" was a computer produced by Hewlett-Packard (HP) in the late 1970s based loosely on the stack-based HP 3000, but with virtual memory for both code and data. The HP300 was cut-short from being a commercial success despite the huge engineering effort, which included HP-developed and -manufactured silicon on sapphire (SOS) processor and I/O chips.

The HP300 was initially designed as a single-user workstation by a totally separate program within the General Systems Division (GSD), the Cupertino, California home of the HP 3000 business computers (the division was later renamed Computer Systems Division CSY). Later, the HP300 design team developed multi-user abilities, and an ahead-of-its-time inter-unit processor interconnect that let one HP300 change registers in other inter-connected HP300's system.

== Features ==
The circuitboards were in a floor pedestal box, with CRT on top with built-in soft keys, and fixed keyboard protruding in front. It pioneered such ideas as built-in networking, automatic spelling correction, multiple windows (on a character-based screen), and labels adjacent to vertically stacked user function keys, now used on ATMs and gas pumps.

The HP300 featured HP-IB (later IEEE-488) interface (IF) as the I/O bus, an 8" floppy disk, and a built-in fixed 12M hard drive. Later drivers for HP7970E tape drive allowed for easier HP300 system back ups. It also had a native system programming language, a database, BASIC, and featured screen editing for RPG.

== Production ==
HP Computer Systems Division General Manager Doug Spreng decided the file system differences between the division's money-making HP3000 line and the burgeoning HP300 would keep the HP300 from being successful, and killed the product. HP built two semi-truckloads of units before shutting down the HP300 production line to meet customer contractual agreements (i.e., in case LLNL wanted more Amigos).

== Design reuse ==
HP commonly reused the work of killed products in other product designs to save money and keep design-team morale up. The processor board and I/O boards were used in later HP 3000 systems that used the HP300's advanced designs: HP3000 model 30 (project name Koala - a single card bay stand-alone box) and model 33 (project name Toothpick - a double card bay table design) reused many of HP300's designs. The HP300 diagnostics (DUS) were ported over and used in these and future HP3000 models.

Later, the HP300 design team over came the first generation HP300 slower TTL circuitry with a SOS design (project name Sizzler). Again the GM killed its release and reused its designs in a new HP3000 model 40 (project name Cub - single card bay stand-alone box) and the model 44 (project name Grizzly - double card bay table design).

The HP3000 models 30, 33, 40, 44, 42, and 48 went on to great success, using what was developed in the HP300. The HP300's change to one (at the time) high-speed interface HP-IB channel from HP3000's previous use of many different type internal IF cards radically changed and improved future HP system designs.

Developed about the same time in Loveland CO, then later in the same GSD Cupertino site, the HP 250 small business system running an easy-to-use HP250 Business Basic language to access HP's Image Database, was based on the HP 9845 workstation using a HP Loveland calculator processor. The built-in CRT head with softkeys and the embedded keyboard design removed from the HP300 were reused in the HP250 table-top designs.

== See also ==
- HP 9845
- HP Roman Extension Set
