= HP-75 =

Hand-held computer by Hewlett-Packard

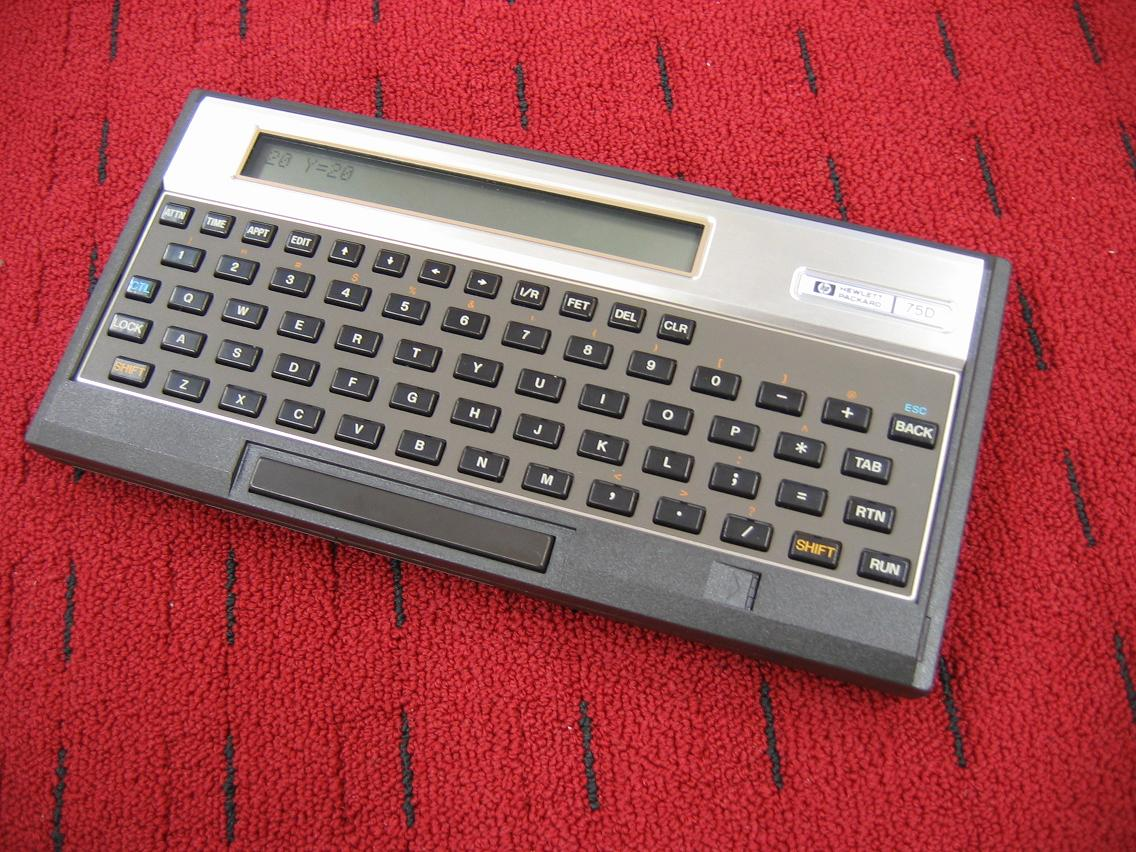
- HP-75D handheld BASIC computer. Magnetic cards are inserted to the right of the space bar key.
- Type: Personal computer
- Released: 1982
- Discontinued: 1986
- Operating system: BASIC
- CPU: 8-bit (Capricorn)
- Memory: 24K, 16K user

The HP-75C and HP-75D were hand-held computers programmable in BASIC, made by Hewlett-Packard from 1982 to 1986.

The HP-75 had a single-line liquid crystal display, 48 KiB system ROM and 16 KiB RAM, a comparatively large keyboard (albeit without a separate numeric pad), a manually operated magnetic card reader (2×650 bytes per card), 4 ports for memory expansion (1 for RAM and 3 for ROM modules), and an HP-IL interface that could be used to connect printers, storage and electronic test equipment. The BASIC interpreter also acted as a primitive operating system, providing file handling capabilities for program storage using RAM, cards, or cassettes/diskettes (via HP-IL). The HP-75 measures 10.1 x 4.9 x 1.5 inches.

Other features included a text editor as well as an appointment reminder with alarms, similar to functions of modern PDAs.

The HP-75D (1984–1986) added a port for a bar code wand, often used for inventory control tasks.

The HP-75 was comparatively expensive with an MSRP of $995 (equivalent to $3,320 in 2025) for the 75C or $1,095 (equivalent to $3,393 in 2025) for the 75D, making it less popular than the cheaper successor model, the HP-71B.

The HP-75C has a KANGAROO printed on its PCB, as its codename (see link for picture).

HP-75D codename's is MERLIN.

== Reception ==
BYTE praised the flexibility of the appointment scheduler, which the review noted could comprise part of a real-time control system because of its ability to execute BASIC programs. It concluded that the computer "is a well-integrated and powerful machine ... if you are interested in ... a very portable computer with powerful real-time scheduling capabilities, you should look closely at the HP-75".
