= DC100 =

Magnetic tape storage format

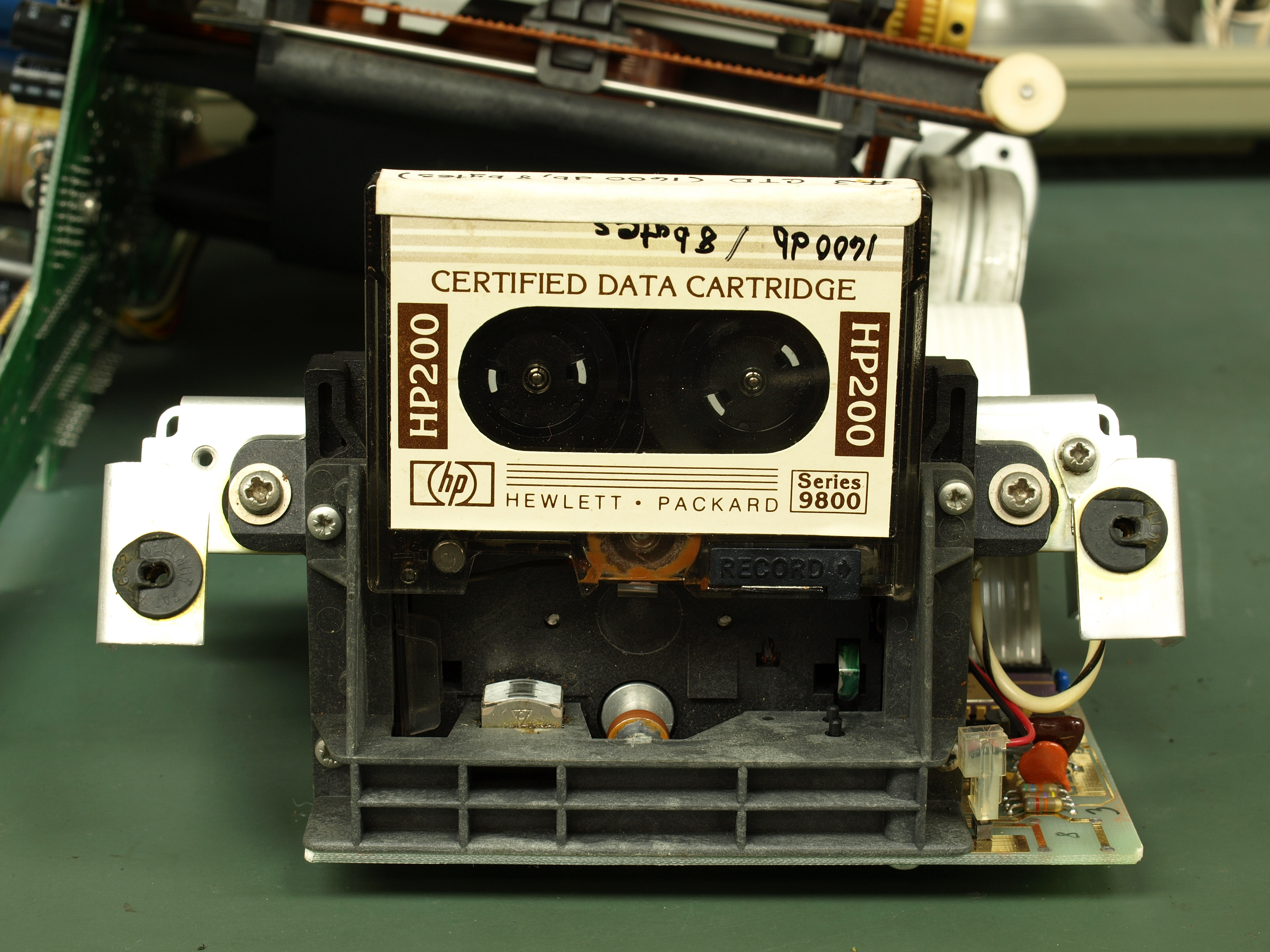
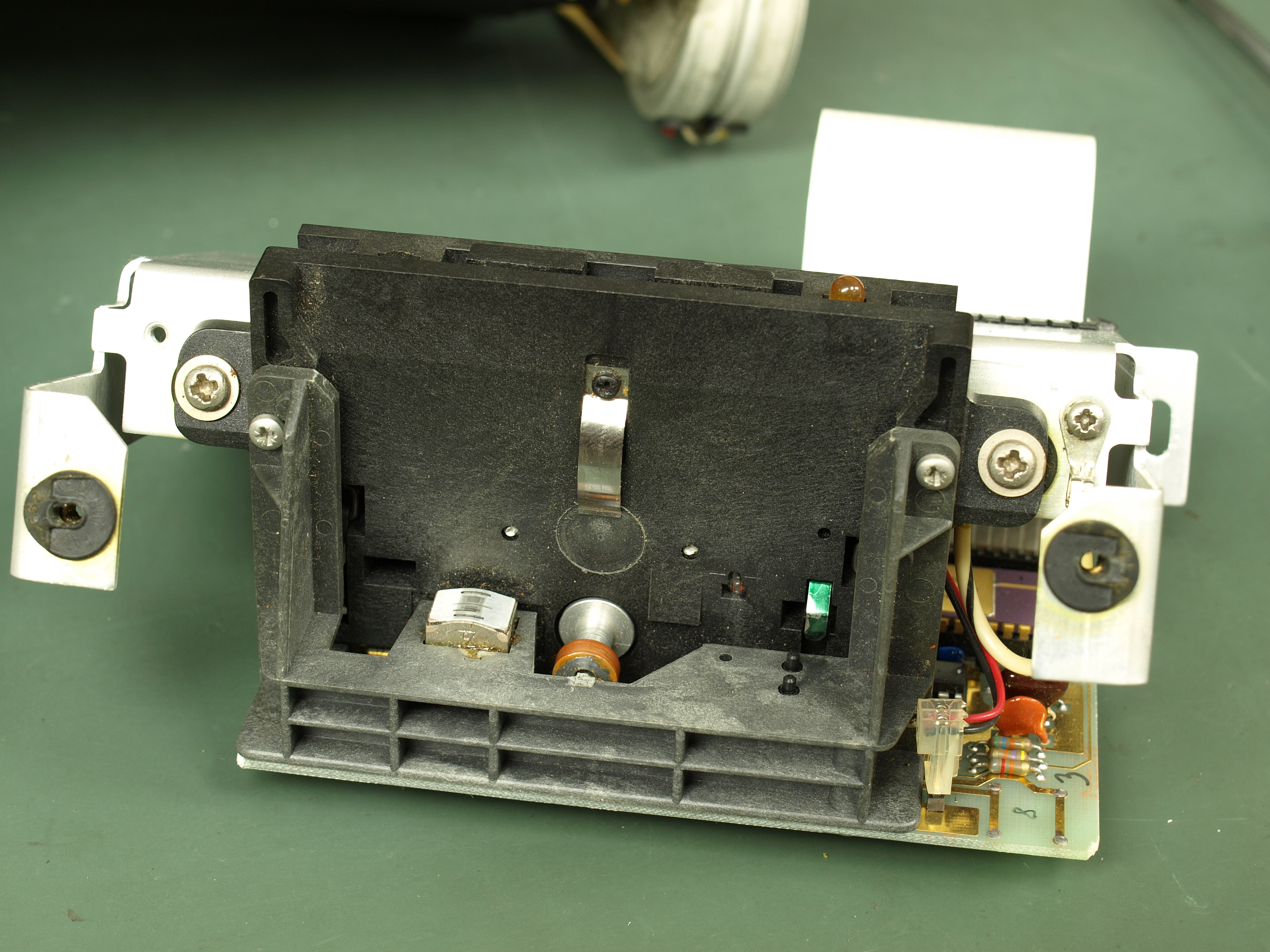
DC100 tape cartridge and transport from an HP 85 desktop computer

DC100 (also known as DC100A) is a tape cartridge format that was co-developed by Hewlett-Packard and 3M. Introduced in mid-1976, it was developed as a data storage mechanism for the HP 9820 programmable calculator. The DC100 tape cartridge was a scaled-down version of the DC300 cartridge pioneered by 3M, and represents an early version of what is now referred to as the QIC Mini Cartridge. 3M was the exclusive source of DC100 tapes, while drives were manufactured by 3M and several third parties.

== History ==
The DC100 tape cartridge format was used in the HP desktop calculator and computer systems of the late 1970s and early 1980s, including the 9815, 9825, 9845, and HP Series 80. HP also used it in their 2640 series of computer terminals. Tape transports were manufactured by 3M, as well as North Atlantic Qantex, Instrumentation Technology Corporation, and Beehive International.

Outside of HP, the format suffered from poor adoption rates four years after its introduction, according to Wayne Green. Bucking this trend, Computer Automation's LSI-2 minicomputers saw compatibility with the DC100 format with the release of the TDCA-100 tape transport system by Telegenix in 1981. In 1984, Irwin Magnetic Systems introduced the Irwin 210 tape backup unit for various platforms that used DC100 tape.

Digital Equipment Corporation's DC150 cartridge, a variation of DC100 with slightly higher capacity, was used in DEC's DECtape II drives. HP later developed the DC200 tape cartridge format on their own; it was based on the design of the DC100 but used thinner tape to increase the amount of data over its predecessor.

== Specifications ==
Comparison between DC100 and DC300
| Property | DC100(A) | DC300 |
|---|---|---|
| Release date | 1976 | 1972 |
| Unformatted capacity | 2.6 MB | 2.9 MB |
| Formatted capacity (Note: 1,000 bytes per block) | 560 KB | 2.5 MB |
| Transfer speed | 48 Kbit/s | 48 Kbit/s |
| Tape length | 140 feet (43 m) | 300 feet (91 m) |
| Tape width | 0.15 inches (0.38 cm) | 0.25 inches (0.64 cm) |
| Transport size (3M-manufactured) | 4 by 3 by 4 inches (10.2 cm × 7.6 cm × 10.2 cm) | 4 by 10 by 7 inches (10 cm × 25 cm × 18 cm) |
| Tracks | 2 | 4 |
| Recording density (ftpi) | 3200 | 3200 |
| Coercivity (Oe) | 310 | 310 |

Notes

Features from 3M

- Base plate flatness.
- Guide posts (essentially the 5 "axles" in the cartridge) into the base plate with sufficient perpendicularity.
- Guide-post surface finish. Too rough, abraded the back of the tape. Too smooth, tape adheres to the guide through stiction, which causes speed flutter on the tape. The right surface treatment was found to be lapidary tumbler, a recipe of abrasive and burnishing compound.
- Guide-post perpendicularity had to be right to avoid differential tension on the tape. In the severe case contact between tape and head was lost. The two most critical guide posts in the manufacture fixture, the hub bearing or axle posts, had to be perpendicular to within approximately 1/3° degrees.
- Lubrication.
- Cartridge’s internal plastic drive belt (critical).

HP improvements on the 3M design

- Tape tension is controlled primarily by friction in two rollers that the belt loops around. 3M controlled belt-roller friction (and hence the tape tension) with a very precise amount of STP lubricant on the bearing surfaces. A better design was to use large axles and Teflon-filled plastic for the bearing rollers, which eliminated the need for lubrication.
- Minimum tape tension at the head was increased, the drive force to spin the drive puck was less however.
- Optical sensing of cartridge in and write protect.
