= HP Series 80 =

1980 Hewlett-Packard small scientific desktop computer

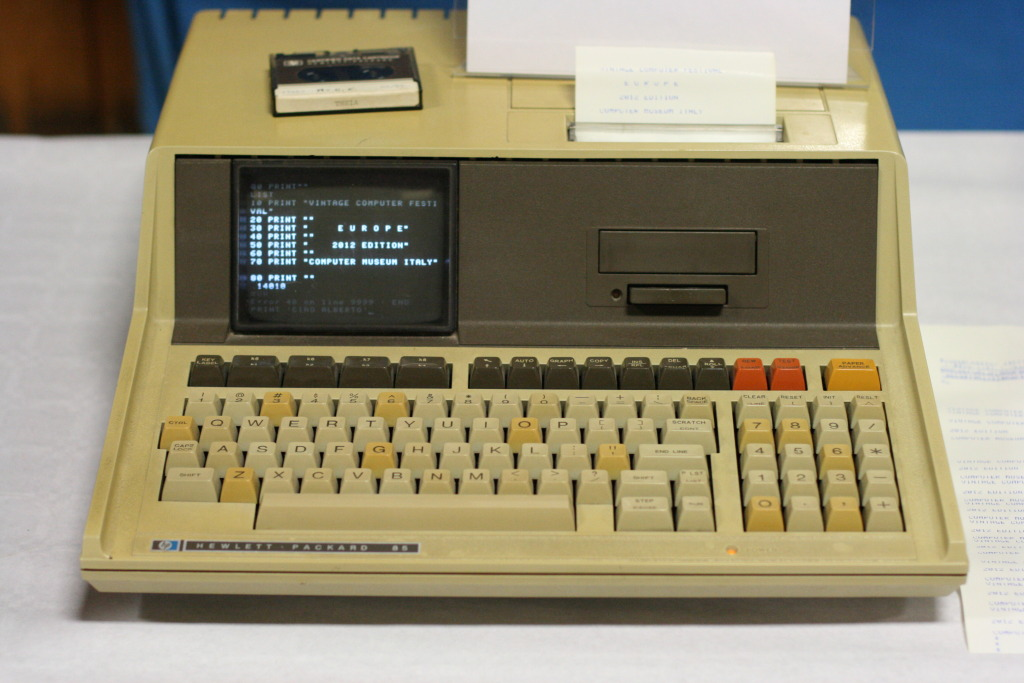
A running HP-85 with a BASIC listing on its screen

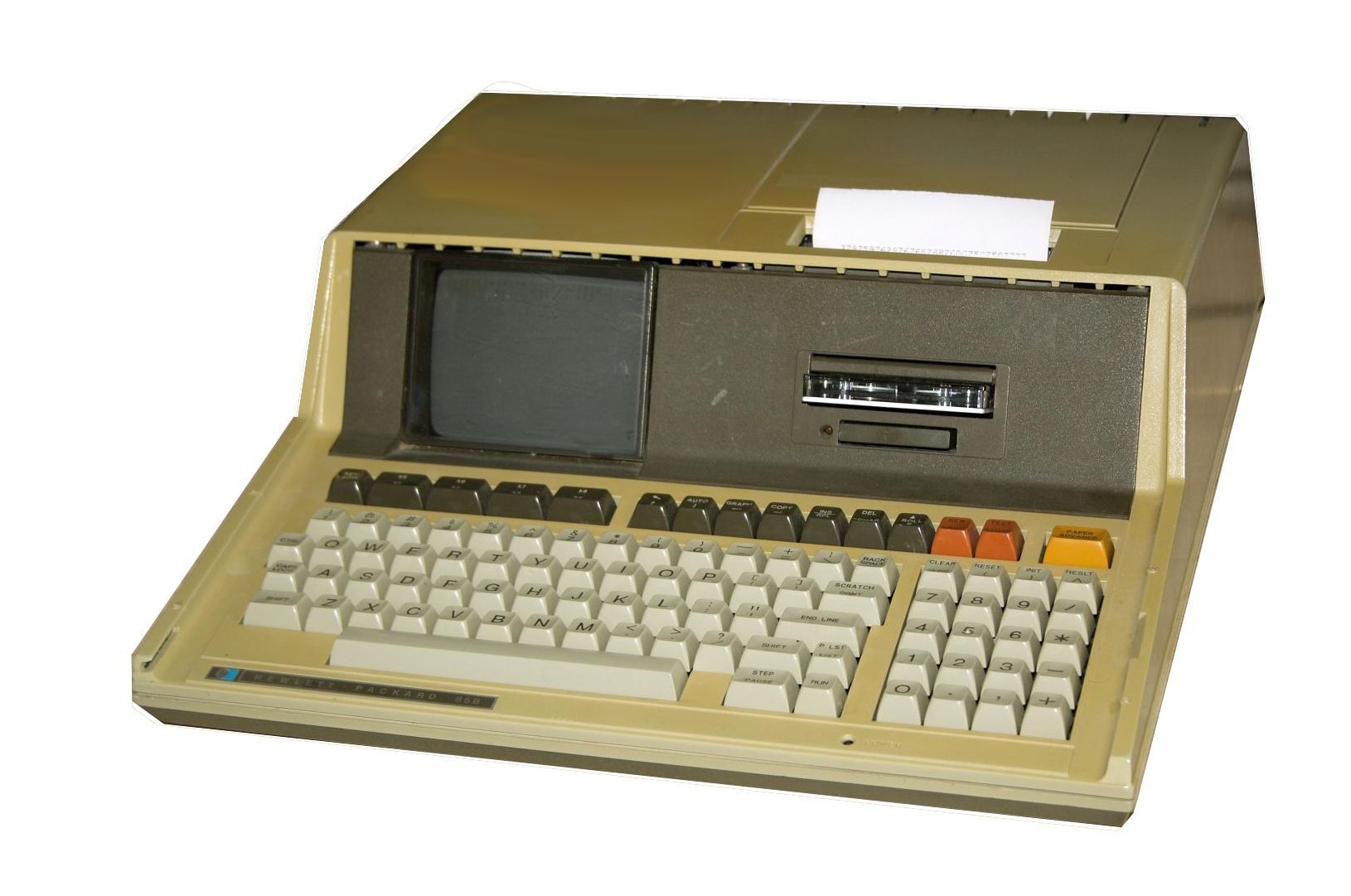
HP-85B

The Hewlett-Packard Series 80 is a discontinued series of small scientific desktop computers that were introduced in 1980, beginning with the popular HP-85 targeted at engineering and control applications. They provided the capability of the HP 9800 series desktop computers with an integrated monitor in a smaller package including storage and printer, at half the price.

== Features ==
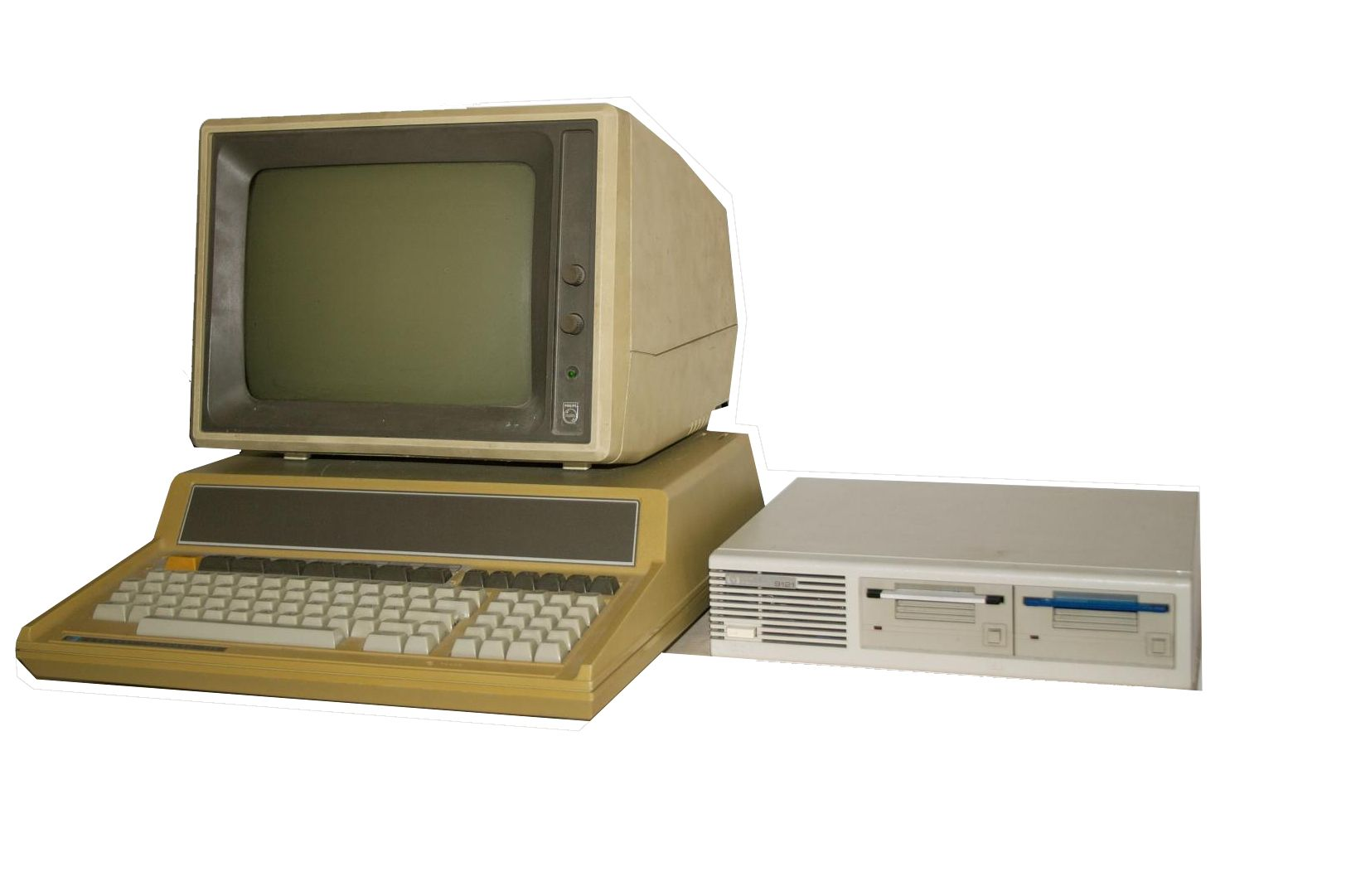
HP-86B with 9121 dual diskette drive

The first model of the Series 80 was the HP-85, introduced in January 1980. BYTE wrote "we were impressed with the performance ... the graphics alone make this an attractive, albeit not inexpensive, alternate to existing small systems on the market ... it is our guess that many personal computer experimenters and hackers will want this machine."

In a typewriter-style desktop case, the US$3,250 (equivalent to $12,700 in 2025) HP-85 contains the CPU and keyboard, with a ROM-based operating system (like the 9800 series), 16 KB dynamic RAM, a 5-inch CRT screen (16 lines of 32 characters, or 256×192 pixels), a tape drive for DC-100 cartridges (210 KB capacity, 650 B/s transfer), and a thermal printer. Both the screen and printer display graphics in addition to text, and the printer can copy anything shown on the screen. The chassis includes four module slots in the back for expansion which can hold memory modules, ROM extensions, or interfaces such as RS-232 and GPIB. All components were designed at the Hewlett-Packard Personal Computer Division in Corvallis, Oregon, including the processor and core chipset.

Later models offered variations such as different or external displays, built-in interfaces or a rack-mountable enclosure (see table below for details).

The machines were built around an HP-proprietary CPU code-named Capricorn running at 625 kHz (0.625 MHz) and had a BASIC interpreter in ROM (32 KB). Programs could be stored on DC-100 cartridge tapes or on external disk/tape units.

Despite the comparatively low processor clock frequency, the machines were quite advanced compared to other desktop computers of the time, in particular regarding software features relevant to technical and scientific use. The standard number representation was a floating point format with a 12-digit (decimal) mantissa and exponents up to ±499. The interpreter supported a full set of scientific functions (trigonometric functions, logarithm etc.) at this accuracy. The language supported two-dimensional arrays, and a ROM extension made high-level functions such as matrix multiplication and inversion available.

For the larger HP-86 and HP-87 series, HP also offered a plug-in CP/M processor card with a separate Zilog Z80 processor. HP would later embrace CP/M more substantially and release the HP-125 running CP/M 2.2 as standard.

== Historical context ==
The late 1970s saw the development of inexpensive home computers such as the Apple II and TRS-80. Steve Wozniak, while working at HP, had developed the Apple computer in his spare time, with the idea of a computer that worked in BASIC when it was turned on. He offered HP rights to the Apple computer, but was turned down and was given a legal release. In an interview he noted that soon after that, the calculator division was starting an 8-bit computer project called Capricorn, which he was not allowed to work on. Ultimately, the market for desktop computing would go to IBM PC compatible personal computers with a floppy disk drive based operating system, and an industry standard Intel 8088 processor (the IBM PC was announced shortly after the 80 series).

== Hardware ==
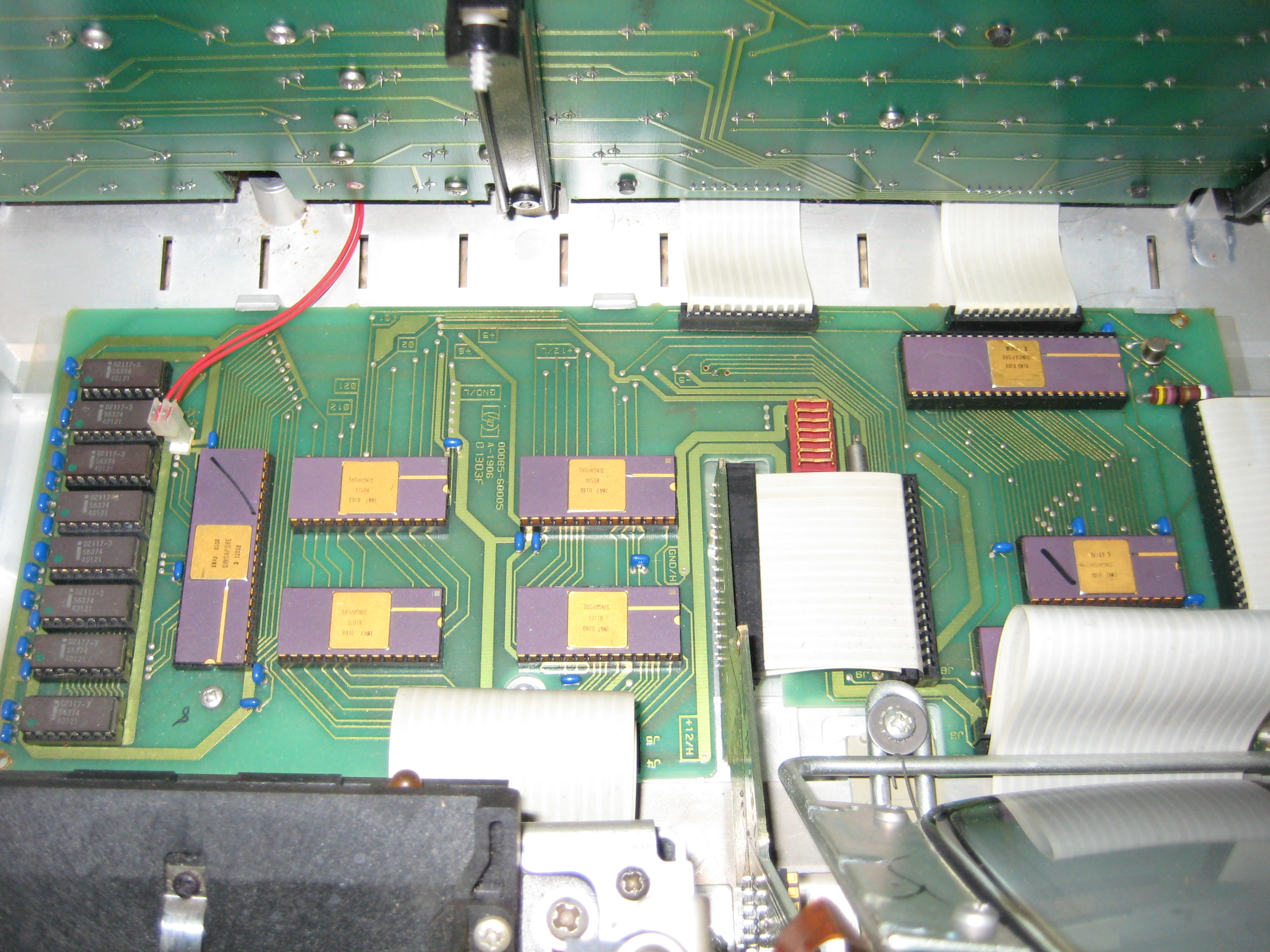
CPU board of HP-85A. From left: 16K DRAM in eight packages, 40-pin RAM controller, four 8K 28-pin ROMs. From top right, going down: 40-pin keyboard controller, 28-pin Capricorn CPU, 40-pin I/O buffer. All except DRAM are custom parts. Click to zoom.

=== Models ===
| Model | Year | Price | Remarks |
|---|---|---|---|
| HP-85A | 1980 | $3,250 | 16K RAM, 32K ROM; 5" CRT, 32×16 text or 256×192 graphics; tape drive, printer |
| HP-83 | 1981 | $2,250 | same as HP-85 without printer and tape drive |
| HP-86A | 1982 | $1,795 | external composite monitor, no tape drive or printer; two interfaces for 9130 floppy and one Centronics printer port built in; 64K RAM |
| HP-87 | 1982 | $2,495 | 9" 80×16 (256×128) display, no printer, no tape, built-in HPIB; 32K RAM |
| HP-85B | 1983 | $2,995 | update to HP-85A; 64K RAM (32K program/variables, 32K RAM disk; I/O, EDISK, and Mass Storage ROM built in |
| HP-86B | 1983 | $1,595 | update to HP-86; built-in HPIB instead of diskette and Centronics ports; 128K RAM; EDISK ROM built-in |
| HP-87XM | 1983 | $2,995 | update to HP-87; built-in HPIB; 128K RAM |
| HP-9915A/B | 1980 | $1,675 | industrial rack-mount version of HP-85A/B without screen or keyboard, I/O ROM and Program Development ROM built in |

=== ROM extensions ===
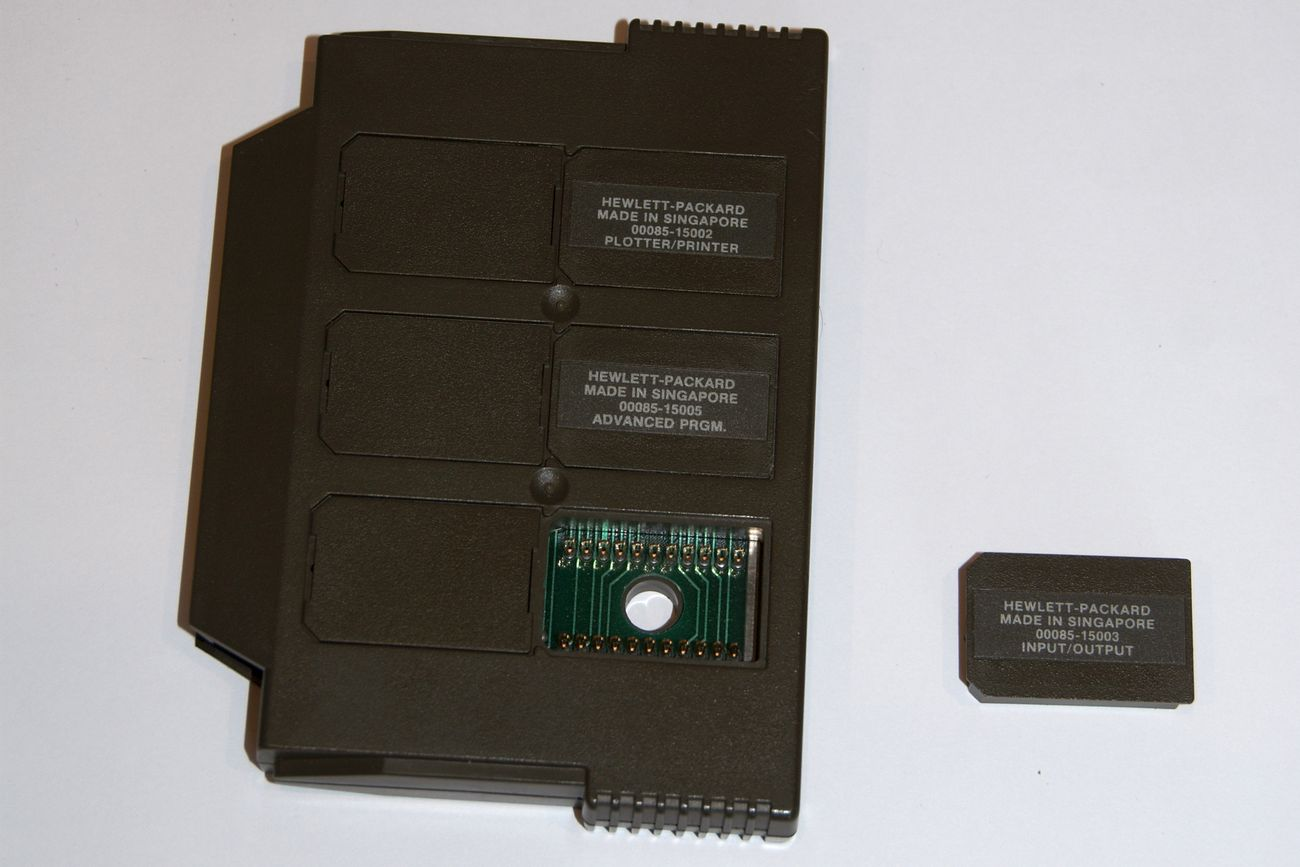
82936A drawer with three ROM modules

Note: The HP-86/87 series used different ROMs (yellow labelling) from the 85/83 models (white labelling).

| 83/85 | 86/87 | Function | Description | ID |
|---|---|---|---|---|
| 00085-15003 | 00087-15003 | I/O | Access GPIB, serial and parallel (GPIO) interfaces | 192 |
| 00085-15001 | built-in | Mass storage | Access "Amigo" compatible diskette/disk drives on GPIB. Built into 85B and all 86/87 models. | 208 |
| 00085-15002 | 00087-15002 | Printer / plotter | Support for external printer/plotter (on 86/87 needed for plotter only) | 240 |
| 00085-15005 | 00087-15005 | Advanced programming | Extended Basic commands | 232,231 |
| —N/a | 00087-15012 | Electronic disk | Use part of RAM as a disk drive, built into 85B, 86B. | 209 |
| 00085-15004 | 00087-15004 | Matrix | Mathematical matrix operations including inversion (solving linear equation systems) | 176 |
| —N/a | 00087-15004 | Matrix 2 | Additional matrix operations | 177 |
| 00085-15007 | 00087-15007 | Assembler | Edit and assemble Series 80 assembler source | 40 |
| —N/a | 00087-15011 | MIKSAM | Indexed file record management | 14 |
| 00085-15013 | 00087-15013 | EMS | Extended Mass Storage, access to SS-80 compatible mass storage | 207 |
| 00085-60952 | 00087-60912 | Service - system | Diagnostic routines for service/maintenance | 224 |
| ? | 00087-60913 | Service - HPIB | Diagnostic routines for service/maintenance | 225 |
| 98151A | —N/a | Program development | Support HP-9915 front panel, or to emulate it on an 83/85 | 8 |
| —N/a | AKSO-Sysext | Sysext | System-Extension: structured programming, self modifying code, low-level programming, made by Andre Koppel Software | 56 |

=== Hardware extensions ===
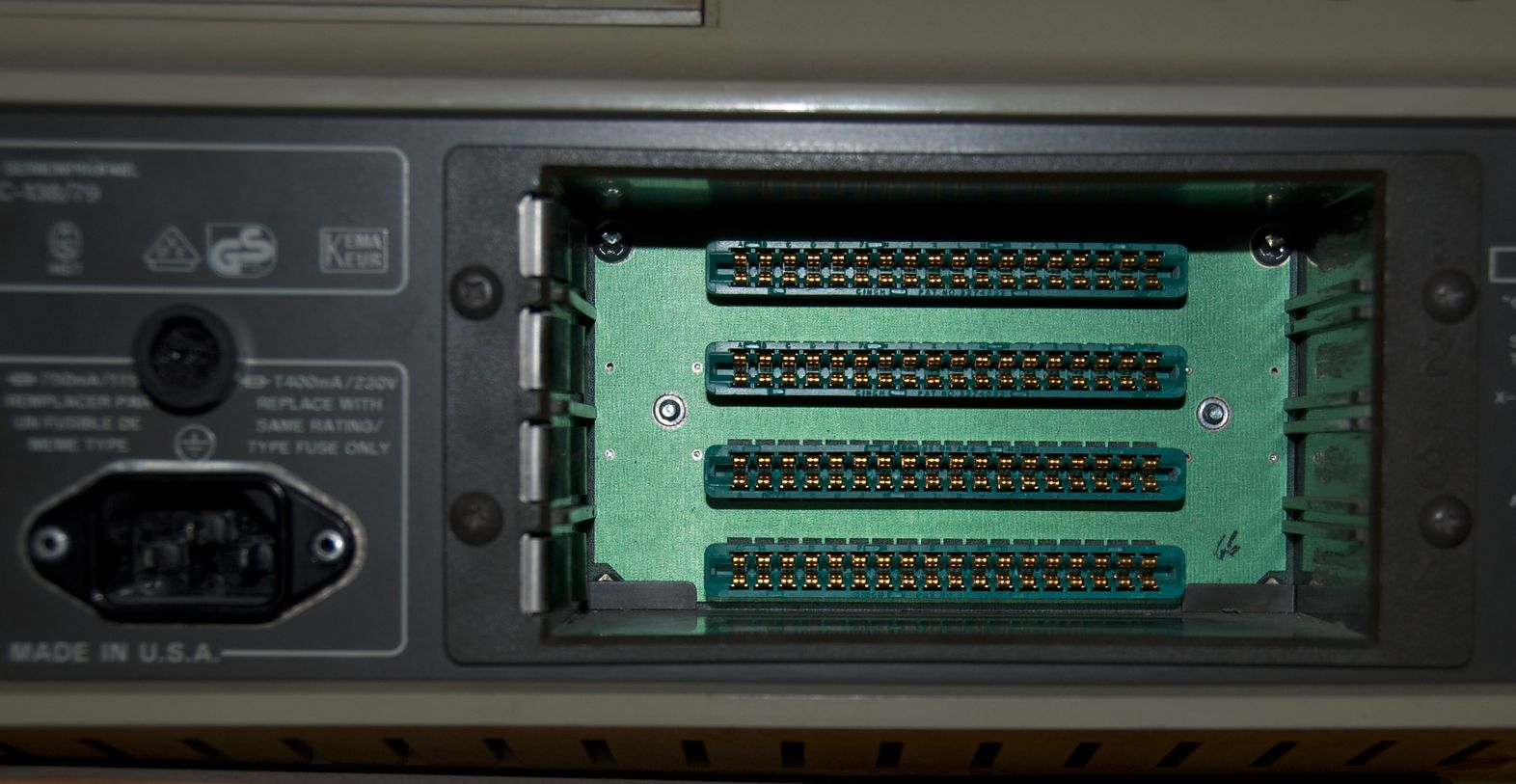
Rear of an HP-85B showing the four extension slots

| 82936A | ROM drawer for up to six of the above ROMs (max one per unit) |
| 82903A | 16 K memory module, for HP-85A only (max one per unit) Note: *Do not use with HP-85B, may cause damage* |
| 82908A | 64 K memory module, for HP-85B or HP-86/87 |
| 82909A | 128 K memory module, for HP-85B or HP-86/87 |
| 82900A | CP/M System (for HP-86/87 only). Contains a Zilog Z80 microprocessor and 64 kilobytes dedicated RAM. |
| 82928A | System monitor for assembly development. Sets break-points for debugging. |
| 82929A | Programmable ROM drawer for standard EPROMs |

=== Interfaces ===
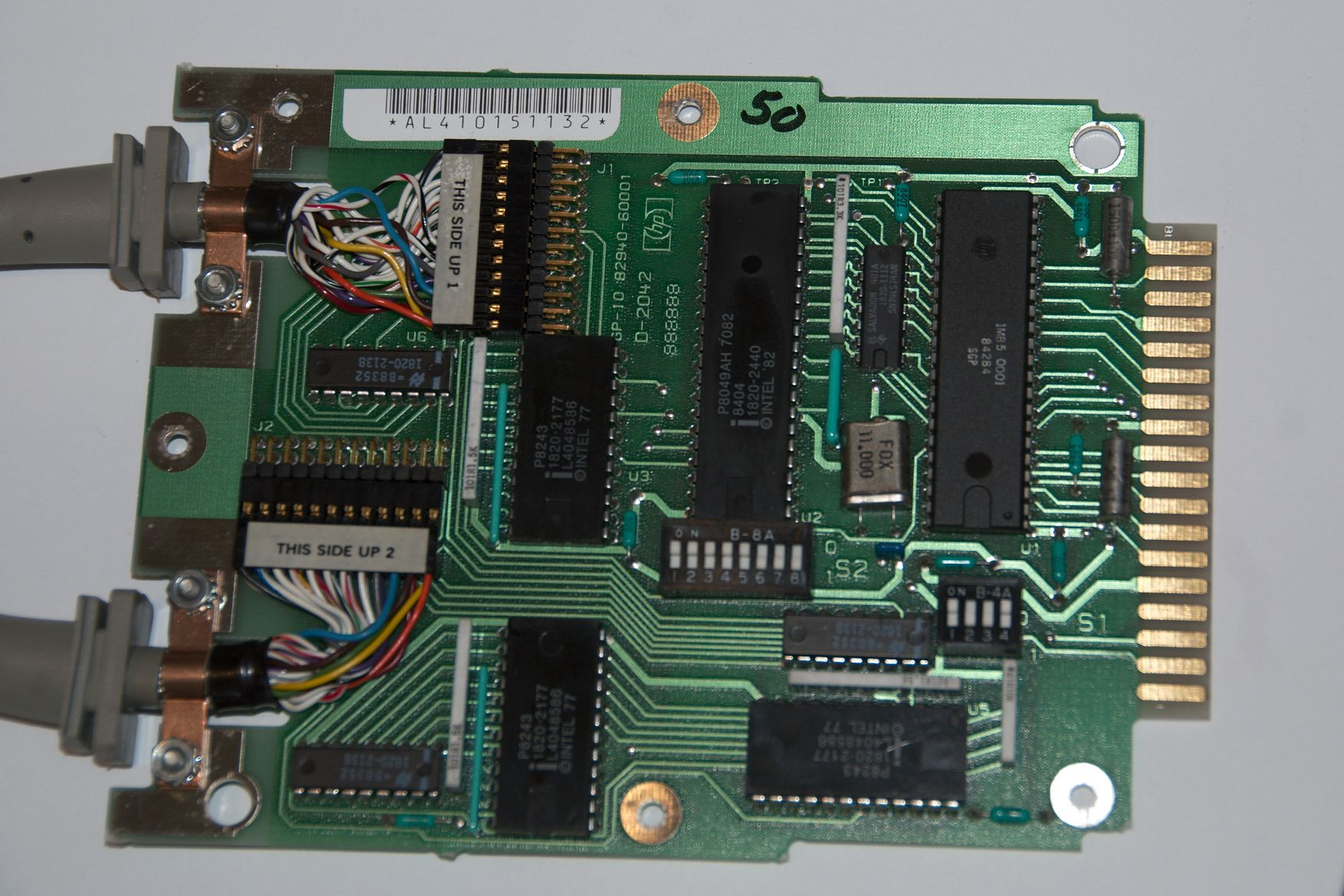
82940A GPIO Interface, enclosure removed

The interface modules for the Series 80 were built around a proprietary bus interface chip connecting a standard Intel 8049 microcontroller to the main bus. Interface functions such as handshaking were offloaded to the 8049 firmware.

| 82937A | HP-IB Interface (GPIB, IEEE-488, IEC625) |
| 82938A | HP-IL Interface |
| 82939A | RS-232 Serial interface |
| 82940A | GPIO interface (general-purpose 4 × 8-bit parallel) |
| 82941A | BCD interface (parallel, 11 binary coded decimal digits + sign) |
| 82949A | Printer interface (Centronics parallel interface) |
| 82950A | Modem (110/300 bit/s, Bell 103/113) |
| 82966A | Data Link Interface (to connect to HP1000/3000 hosts) |
| 82967A | Speech synthesis module, 1500-word vocabulary using a Texas Instruments TMS5220 synthesizer chip |

== Software ==
Four commercial games were released by Hewlett-Packard for the Series 80 computers. For the HP-83/85, these were Games Applications Pac and Games II Pac. For the HP-86/87, the released titles were Action Games Pac and Galaxy Patrol.
