= HP-71B =

Late 1980s programmable handheld computer

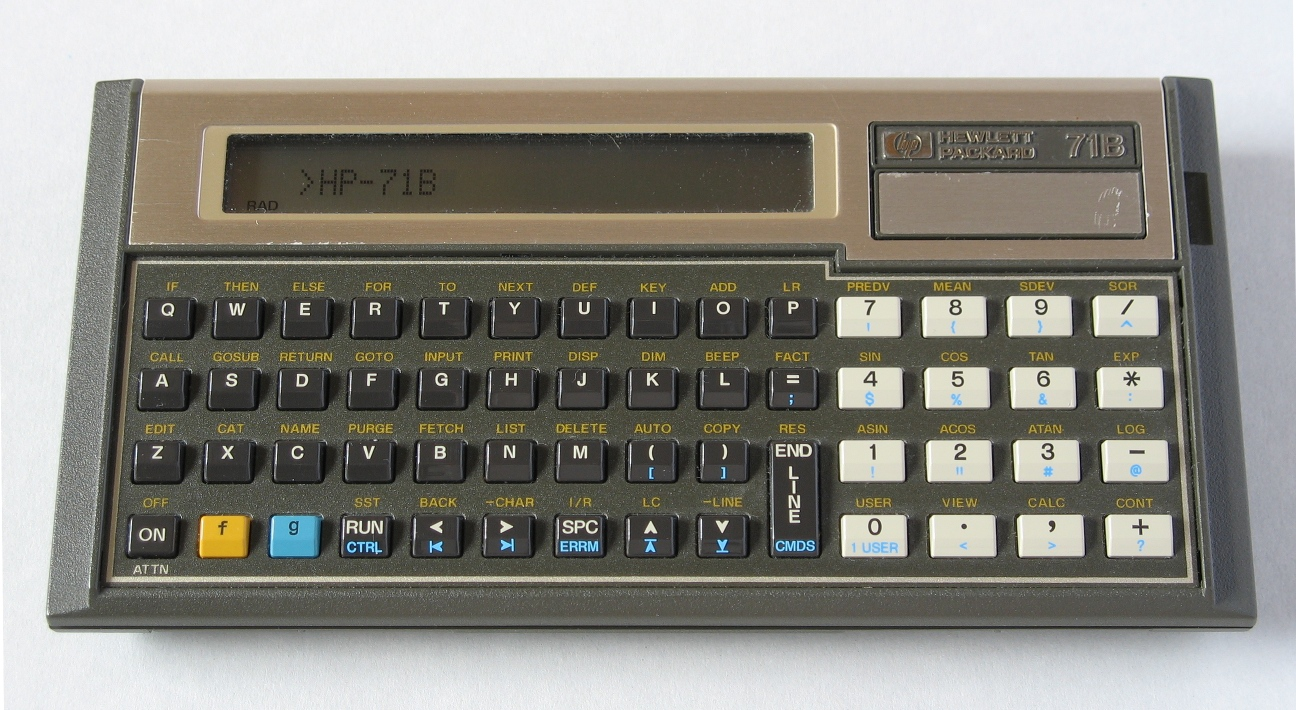
- HP-71B handheld BASIC computer

Calculator
- Entry mode: BASIC

The HP-71B was a hand-held computer or calculator programmable in BASIC, made by Hewlett-Packard from 1984 to 1989.

== Description ==
At 7.5 × 3.875 × 1 inch (19 × 9.7 × 2.5 cm), the HP-71B is smaller and less expensive than the preceding model, the HP-75. The 71B has a single-line 22-character liquid crystal display, 64K system ROM and 17.5K user memory. Priced at US$595 MSRP (US$1,800 in 2024), it operates on four AAA batteries or on AC adaptor. Four plug-in ports permits ROM-based programs or additional user memory to be added. Separate compartments could accommodate an optional magnetic card reader and an optional HP-IL interface (HP 82401A) that could be used to connect printers, storage and electronic test equipment.

The 71B was the first handheld to implement the IEEE 854-1987 radix-independent floating-point standard. Programming features included a real-time clock, programmable timers and subroutine calls with parameter passing and recursion. It was also HP's first calculator based on the Saturn processor, later versions of which are found in the popular HP-48 series calculators and most more recent HP calculator models.

Since the hand-pulled magnetic cards (HP-75 compatible) could only store two tracks of 650 bytes each, the card reader (installed under the logo plate above the numeric keyboard) was not a very popular option. Larger storage capacities could be accommodated through HP-IL peripherals such as the 82161A cassette drive or 9114A diskette drive that were also battery-powered and portable, if rather bulky compared to the 71B. Subsequently, memory expansion modules to fit the card reader compartment became available from third-party vendors.

Other third-party options included a bar code wand and application ROMs to plug into one of the four memory ports. A HP-71 configuration with bar code wand and a custom application was widely used for data collection in the British Department of Health and Social Security (DHSS).

Unlike HP-75 or HP-41, the 71B could also act as a device in a HP-IL loop controlled by another device, allowing several of them in the same loop, communicating with each other (or an HP-75 or HP-41) or sharing peripherals. Using an HP 82402 Dual HP-IL controller, it was even possible to connect one 71B to two HP-IL loops simultaneously, possibly as a controller in one and as a device in another.

The HP-71B could optionally be made compatible with the large volume of programs written for the HP-41 series of calculators via a plug-in ROM that emulated the HP-41 at about 5x the original speed.

== Internal Design Specification ==
Another notable "feature" of the 71B was that HP sold to the public a series of documents (IDS: Internal Design Specification) containing the nearly complete internal engineering details of the unit. A series of four IDSes were published about the software contained in the 71B's ROM; this included the complete source code (in assembly language) for the entire contents of ROM, and extensive additional design documentation of the ROM software. Other IDSes were released covering the 71B's hardware, the Forth/Assembler add-in ROM, and the add-in HP-IL controller.
