= Minority languages of Kosovo =

Languages of Kosovo
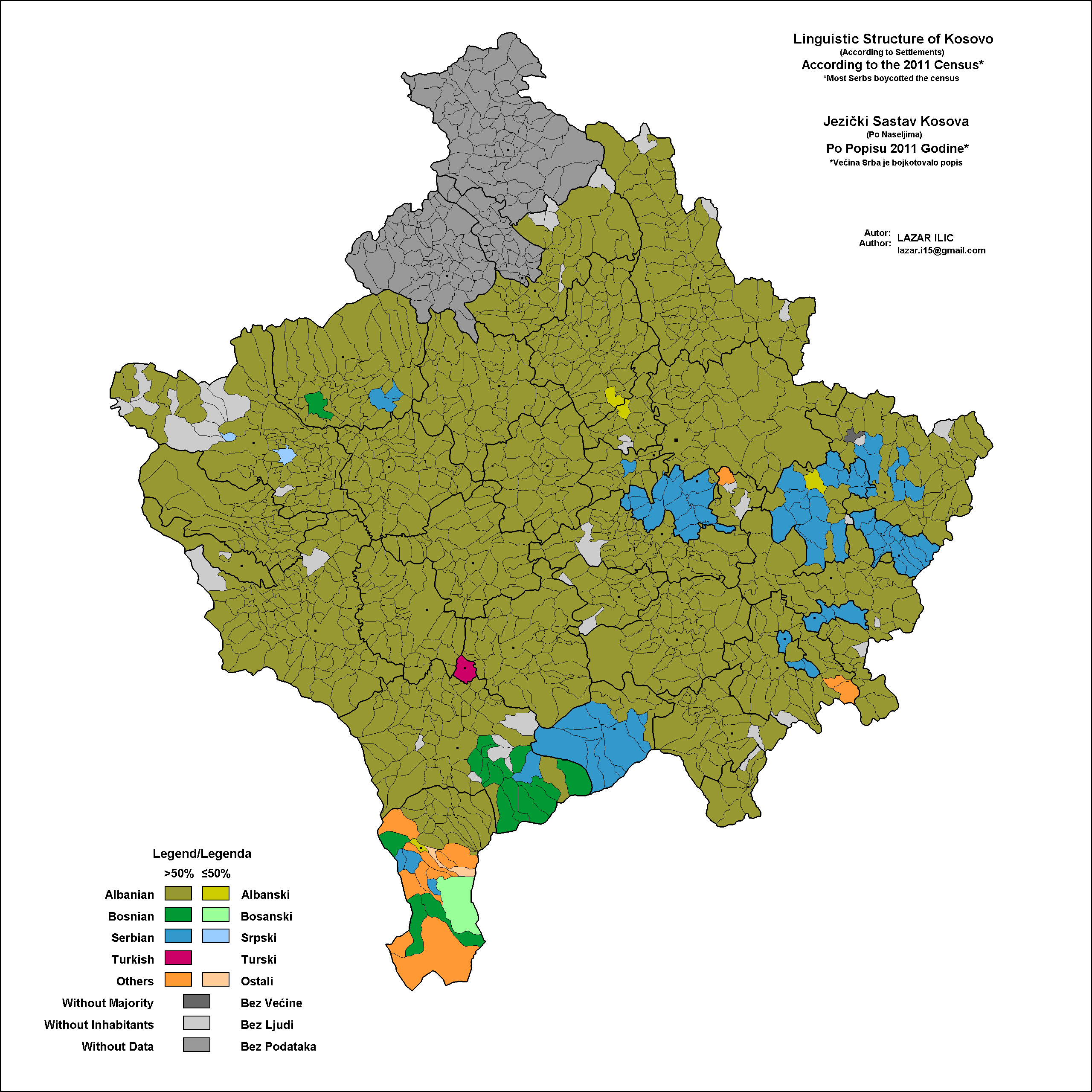
- Linguistic structure of Kosovo, according to the 2011 census.
- Official: Albanian; Serbian
- Minority: Bosnian; Gorani; Romani; Turkish
- Signed: Yugoslav Sign Language
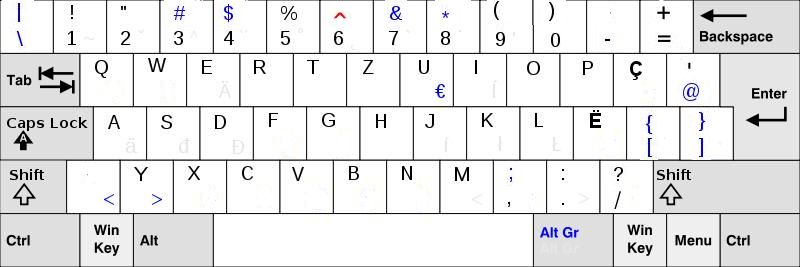
- Keyboard layout: QWERTZ (Albanian keyboard layout)

Although the Albanian language is the dominant language in Kosovo, equal status is given to Serbian and special status is given to other minority languages. The legislative framework for the protection and promotion of minority languages follows the Framework Convention for the Protection of National Minorities and the European Charter for Regional or Minority Languages, even though the country is not a member of the Council of Europe. However, a lack of political will to enforce the law by Kosovo's institutions and the continued separation of Serb and Albanian communities impede the actual enjoyment of minority language rights.

The Assembly of Kosovo adopted the Law on the Use of Languages in 2006, which committed Kosovo's institutions to ensuring the equal use of Albanian and Serbian as the official languages in Kosovo. Other languages can also gain recognition at municipal level as official languages if the linguistic community represents at least 5% of the total population within the municipality. Additionally, the Law on the Use of Languages gives Turkish the status of an official language in the municipality of Prizren, irrespective of the size of the Turkish community living there. Although both Albanian and Serbian are official languages, municipal civil servants are only required to speak one of them in a professional setting and, according to Language Commissioner of Kosovo Slaviša Mladenović statement from 2015, no organizations have all of their documents in both languages.
