= Tastiera shqip =

Albanian modified keyboard layout

Tastiera Shqip DK is an Albanian modified keyboard layout, fully compliant with the new way Albanians use computers. The layout was studied by the teams of Pasioni and Albword. The software is free to download, use and distribute for personal use only.
