= Keyboard layout =

Arrangement of keys on a typographic keyboard

The 104-key US QWERTY layout

A keyboard layout is any specific physical, visual, or functional arrangement of key switches, legends, or key mapping (respectively) of a keyboard. Layouts are used on computer keyboards, for virtual keyboards (including mobile phones or other touchscreens), or other typographic input devices. Standard layouts vary depending on their intended writing system, language, and use case. Some hobbyists and designers create alternative layouts to better suit individual preferences or to extend functionality.

Layouts can be described in several ways depending on form or function. A physical layout is the positioning of physical keys on a keyboard. The arrangement of keycap legends, such as markings or labels, is described as a visual layout. Keyboard mapping represents a functional layout, and the association of keys with their action when pressed. This is configured in software or firmware, and determines the action upon one or multiple key presses, regardless of key appearance.

Modern computer keyboards are designed to send a scancode to the operating system (OS) when a key is pressed or released. This code reports only the key's row and column, not the specific character engraved on that key. The OS converts the scancode into a specific binary character code using a "scancode to character" conversion table, called the keyboard mapping table. This means that a physical keyboard may be dynamically mapped to any layout without switching hardware components—merely by changing the software that interprets the keystrokes. Often, (Note: depending on OS and (where applicable) institutional policy.) a user can change keyboard mapping in system settings. In addition, software may be available to modify or extend keyboard functionality. (Note: Using, for example, AltGr to add a third and fourth function to each key; the AltGr key may itself be a reassignment of the right-hand Alt key.) Thus the symbol shown on the physical key-top need not be the same as appears on the screen or goes into a document being typed. Most modern USB and wireless keyboards are plug-and-play, and communicate their (default) visual layout to the OS when connected. Some keyboards have firmware which can configure layouts, as well as customize lighting and other functions.

== Key types ==
A typical 105-key computer keyboard, consisting of sections with different types of keys

A computer keyboard may consist of several types of keys, including alphanumeric or character keys for typing, modifier keys for altering the functions of other keys, navigation keys (or nav cluster) for moving the text cursor (or caret), function keys and system keys for special actions (such as Esc and Break), and a numeric keypad to facilitate calculations or data entry.

Different keyboard models vary in physical layout, such as in the number of keys and how they are positioned on the keyboard. However, most layouts localized for other languages differ in keycap legends rather than physical position.

=== Character keys ===
The core section of a keyboard consists of character keys, which can be used to type letters and other characters. Typically, there are three rows of keys for typing letters and punctuation, an upper row for typing digits and special symbols, and the Space bar on the bottom row. The positioning of the character keys is similar to the keyboard of a typewriter.

=== Modifier keys ===
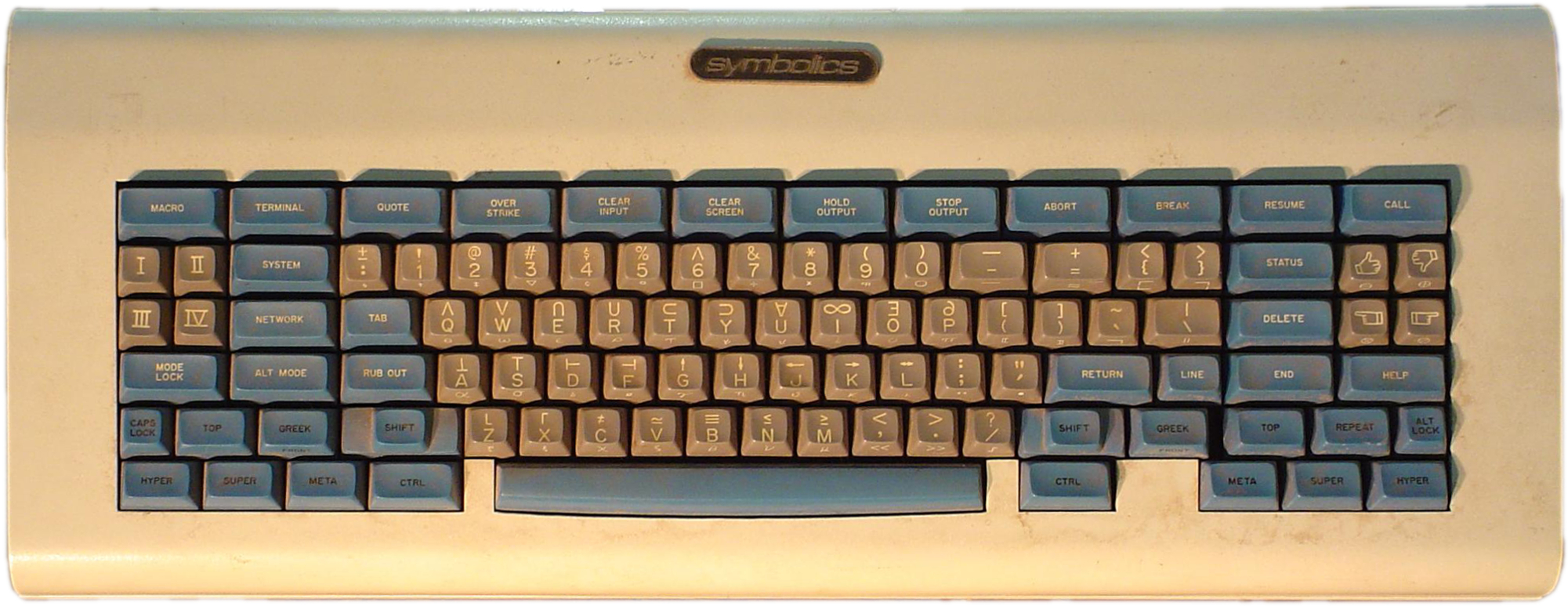
MIT "space-cadet" keyboard, a pre-ISO/IEC 9995 keyboard with a large number of modifier keys. It is equipped with four keys for bucky bits (Control, Meta, Hyper, and Super); and three shift keys, called "shift", "top", and "front".

Besides the character keys, a keyboard incorporates special keys that do nothing by themselves but modify the functions of other keys. For example, the ⇧ Shift key can be used to alter the output of character keys, whereas the Ctrl (control), Alt (alternate) and AltGr (alternative graphic) keys trigger special operations when used in concert with other keys. (Apple keyboards have differently labelled but equivalent keys, see below).

Typically, a modifier key is held down while another key is struck. To facilitate this, modifier keys usually come in pairs, one functionally identical key for each hand, so holding a modifier key with one hand leaves the other hand free to strike another key.

An alphanumeric key labelled with only a single letter (usually the capital form) can generally be struck to type either a lowercase or capital letter, the latter requiring the simultaneous holding of the ⇧ Shift key. The ⇧ Shift key is also used to type the upper of two symbols engraved on a given key, the lower being typed without using the modifier key.

The Latin alphabet keyboard has a dedicated key for each of the letters A–Z, keys for punctuation and other symbols, usually a row of function keys, often a numeric keypad and some system control keys. In most languages except English, additional letters (some with diacritics) are required, and some are present as standard on each national keyboard, as appropriate for its national language. These keyboards have another modified key, labelled AltGr (alternative graphic), to the right of the space bar. (US keyboards just have a second Alt key in this position). It can be used to type an extra symbol in addition to the two otherwise available with an alphanumeric key, and using it simultaneously with the ⇧ Shift key usually gives access to a fourth symbol. These third-level and fourth-level symbols may be engraved on the right half of the key top, or they may be unmarked. Cyrillic alphabet and Greek alphabet keyboards have similar arrangements.

Instead of the Ctrl, Alt and AltGr keys seen on commodity keyboards, Apple keyboards have ⌘ Cmd (command) and ⌥ Option keys. The ⌥ Option key is used much like the AltGr, and the ⌘ Cmd key like the Ctrl and Alt, to access menu options and shortcuts. Macs have a Ctrl key for compatibility with programs that expect a more traditional keyboard layout. The key can generally be used to produce a secondary mouse click as well. There is also a Fn key on modern Mac keyboards, which is used for switching between use of the F1, F2, etc. keys either as function keys or for other functions like media control, accessing Spotlight, controlling the volume, or handling Mission Control. Fn key can also be found on smaller Windows and Linux laptops and tablets, where it serves a similar purpose.

Many Unix workstations (and also home computers like the Amiga) keyboards place the Ctrl key to the left of the letter A, and the ⇪ Caps Lock key in the bottom left. This position of the Ctrl key is also used on the XO laptop, which does not have a ⇪ Caps Lock. The Unix keyboard layout also differs in the placement of the Esc key and place it to the left of 1.

Some early keyboard designers experimented with using large numbers of modifier keys. The most extreme example of such a keyboard, the so-called "space-cadet keyboard" found on MIT LISP machines, has no fewer than seven modifier keys: four control keys, Ctrl, Meta, Hyper, and Super, along with three shift keys, ⇧ Shift, Top, and Front. This allows the user to type over 8000 possible characters by playing suitable "chords" with many modifier keys pressed simultaneously.

==== Dead keys ====
A dead key is a special kind of modifier key that, instead of being held while another key is struck, is pressed and released before the other key. The dead key does not generate a character by itself, but it modifies the character generated by the key struck immediately after, typically making it possible to type a letter with a specific diacritic. For example, on some keyboard layouts, the grave accent key ` is a dead key: in this case, striking ` and then a results in à (a with grave accent); ` followed by ⇧ Shift+E results in È (E with grave accent). A grave accent in isolated form can be typed by striking ` and then Space bar.

A key may function as a dead key by default, or sometimes a normal key can temporarily be altered to function as a dead key by simultaneously holding down the secondary-shift key—AltGr or ⌥ Option: a typical example might be AltGr+6 a will produce â (assuming the "6" key is also the "^" key). In some systems, there is no indication to the user that a dead key has been struck, so the key appears dead, but in some text-entry systems the diacritical mark is displayed along with an indication that the system is waiting for another keystroke: either the base character to be marked, an additional diacritical mark, or Space bar to produce the diacritical mark in isolation.

Compared with the secondary-shift modifier key, the dead-key approach may be a little more complicated, but it allows more additional letters. Using AltGr, only one or (if used simultaneously with the normal shift key) two additional letters with each key, whereas using a dead key, a specific diacritic can be attached to a range of different base letters.

==== Compose key ====
A Compose key can be characterized as a generic dead key that may, in some systems, be available instead of or in addition to the more specific dead keys. It allows access to a wide range of predefined extra characters by interpreting a whole sequence of keystrokes following it. For example, striking Compose followed by ' (apostrophe) and then A results in á (a with acute accent), Compose followed by A and then E results in æ (ae ligature/letter), and Compose followed by O and then C results in © (copyright symbol).

The Compose key is supported by the X Window System (used by most Unix-like operating systems, including most Linux distributions). Some keyboards have a key labeled "Compose", but any key can be configured to serve this function. For example, the otherwise redundant right-hand ⊞ Win key may, when available, be used for this purpose. This can be emulated in Windows with third-party programs, such as WinCompose.

=== System command keys ===
Depending on the application, some keyboard keys are not used to enter a printable character but instead are interpreted by the system as formatting, mode shift, or special commands. These may be found on personal computer keyboards.

==== SysRq and PrtSc ====
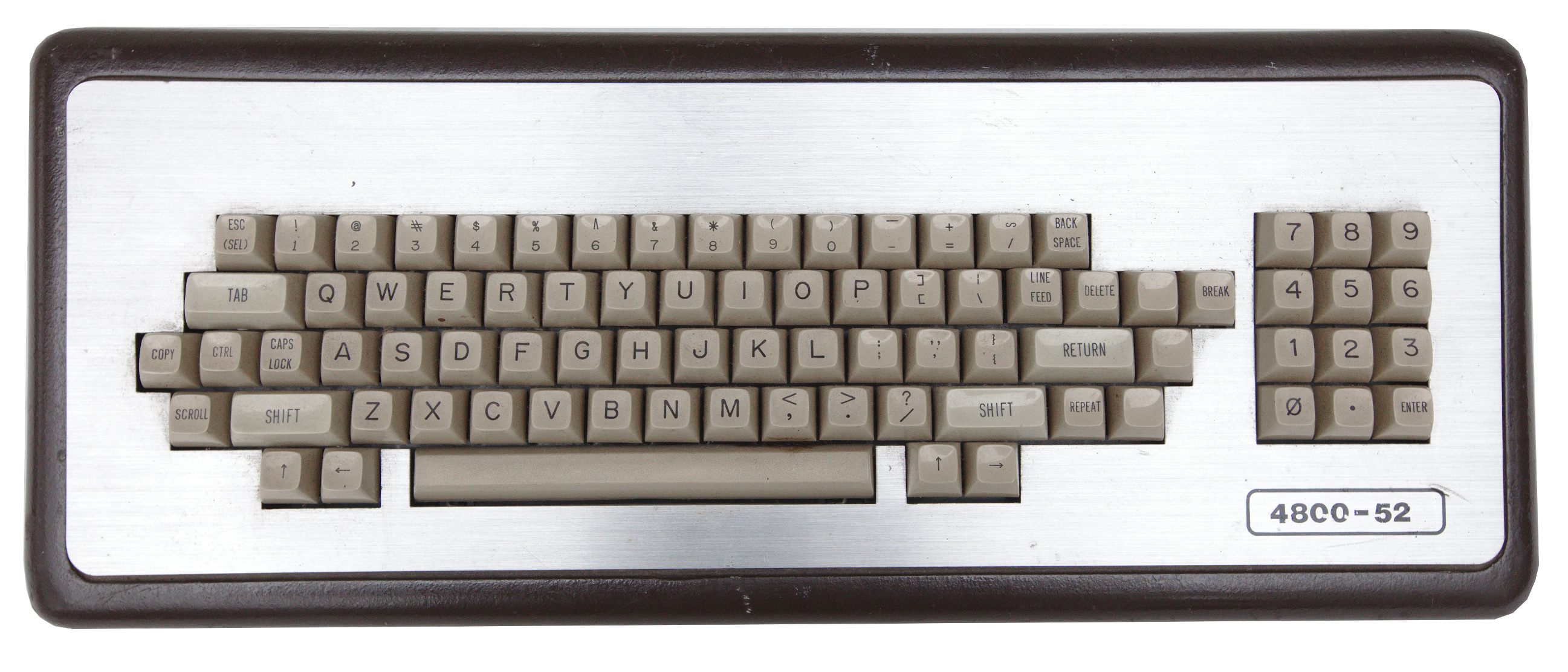
4800-52 mainframe / dumb terminal keyboard, c. mid-1980s. There is an obscure configuration of modifier and arrow keys, line feed key, break key, blank keys, and repeat key.

The system request (SysRq) and print screen (PrtSc or on some keyboards e.g. PrtScn) commands often share the same key. SysRq was used in earlier computers as a "panic" button to recover from crashes (and it is still used in this sense to some extent by the Linux kernel; see Magic SysRq key). The print screen command is used to capture the entire screen and send it to the printer, but in the present, it usually puts a screenshot in the clipboard.

==== Break key ====
The Break or Pause key no longer has a well-defined purpose. Its origins go back to teleprinter users, who wanted a key that would temporarily interrupt the communications line. The Break key can be used by software in several different ways, such as to switch between multiple login sessions, to terminate a program, or to interrupt a modem connection.

In programming, especially old DOS-style BASIC, Pascal and C, Break is used (in conjunction with Ctrl) to stop program execution. In addition to this, Linux and variants, as well as many DOS programs, treat this combination the same as Ctrl+C. On modern keyboards, the break key is usually labeled Pause/Break. In most Microsoft Windows environments, the key combination WindowsPause brings up the system properties.

==== Escape key ====
The escape key (often abbreviated Esc) usually signals Stop, QUIT, or "let me get out of a dialog" (or pop-up window).

Another common application today of the Esc key is to trigger the Stop button in many web browsers and operating systems.

ESC was part of the standard keyboard of the Teletype Model 33 (introduced in 1964 and used with many early minicomputers). The DEC VT50, introduced July 1974, also had an Esc key. The TECO text editor (c. 1963) and its descendant Emacs (c. 1985) use the Esc key extensively.

Historically, it also served as a type of shift key, such that one or more following characters were interpreted differently, hence the term escape sequence, which refers to a series of characters, usually preceded by the escape character.

On machines running Microsoft Windows, prior to the implementation of the Windows key on keyboards, the typical practice for invoking the "start" button was to hold down the control key and press Escape. This process still works in Windows 10 and 11.

==== Enter key ====
An "enter" key may terminate a paragraph of text and advance an editing cursor to the start of the next available line, similar to the "carriage return" key of a typewriter. When the attached system is processing a user command line, pressing "enter" may signal that the command has been completely entered and that the system may now process it.

==== Shift key ====
When one presses a letter, it will capitalize the letter pressed with the shift key. Another use is to type more symbols than appear to be available; for instance, the semi-colon key is accompanied by a colon symbol on the top. To type a semi-colon, the key is pressed without pressing any other key. To type a colon, both this key and the Shift key are pressed concurrently. Some systems make provision for users with mobility impairment by allowing the Shift key to be pressed first and then the desired symbol key.

==== Menu key, Command key, Windows key ====
The Menu key, or Application key, is found on Windows-oriented computer keyboards. On Apple keyboards, the same function is provided by the Command key (labelled ⌘). It is used to launch a context menu with the keyboard rather than with the usual right mouse button. The key's symbol is usually a small icon depicting a cursor hovering above a menu. On some Samsung keyboards, the cursor in the icon is not present, showing the menu only. This key was created at the same time as the Windows key. This key is normally used when the right mouse button is not present on the mouse. Some Windows public terminals do not have a Menu key on their keyboard to prevent users from right-clicking (however, in many Windows applications, a similar functionality can be invoked with the Shift+F10 keyboard shortcut).

The Windows key opens the 'Start' (applications) menu.

== History ==
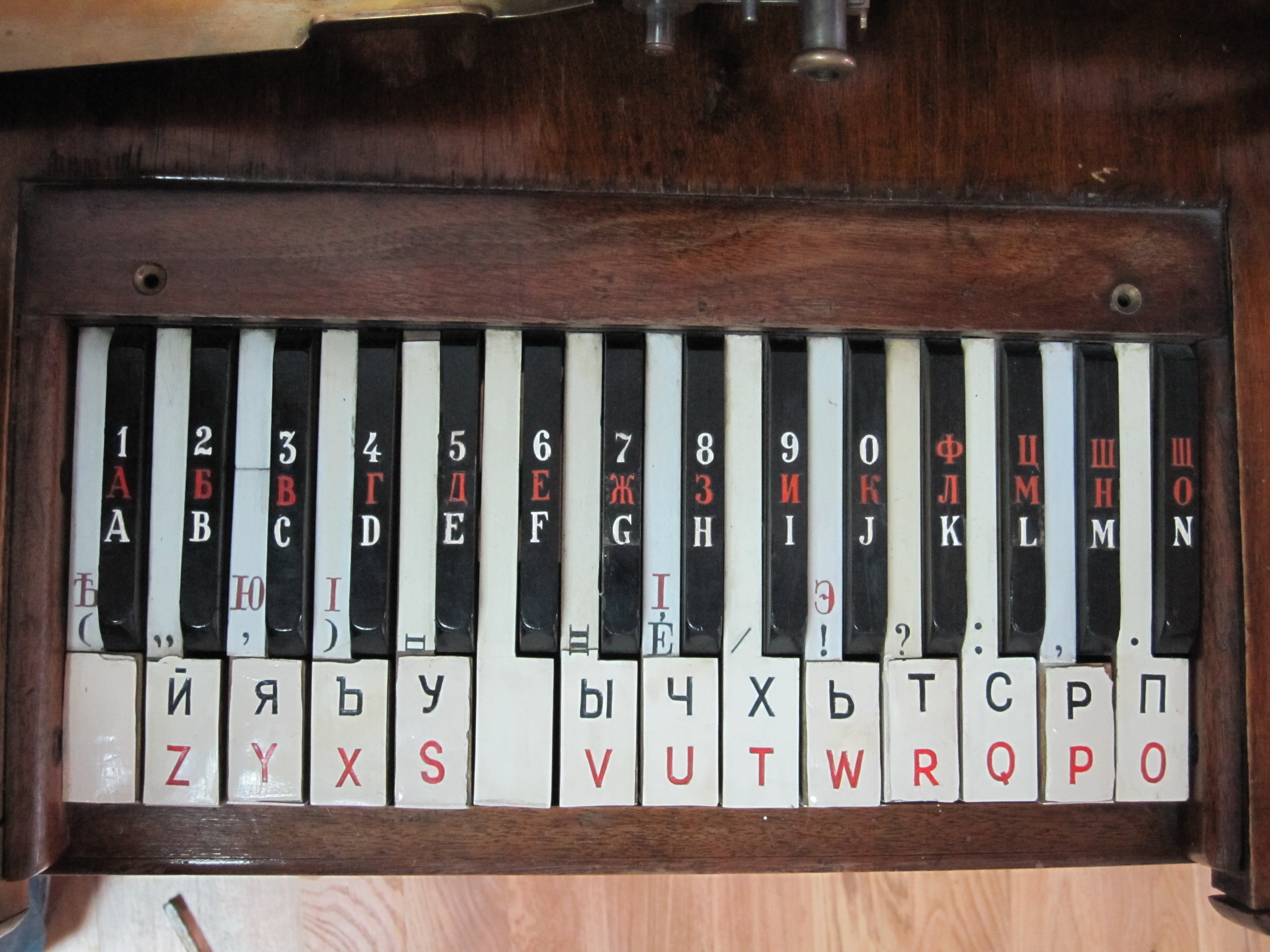
Keyboard of a Letter-Printing Telegraph Set built by Siemens and Halske in Russia c. 1900

Keyboard layouts have evolved over time, often alongside major technology changes.

The QWERTY layout was developed in the 1870s by Christopher Latham Sholes. It was then used on the Sholes and Glidden typewriter, which was marketed in 1874 as the Remington No. 1, becoming the first commercially successful typewriter. In 1878, the Remington No. 2 introduced the shift key. The first IBM Selectric was released in 1961, and became a highly influential electric typewriter, later influencing computer keyboards. and the IBM PC (1981), namely the Model M (1985), which was the basis for many modern keyboard layouts.

The usage of a keyboard layout within a community is generally stable, due to the training cost of touch-typing, and the switching cost of retraining. There may also be a network effect of having a standard layout. For example, the ubiquity of the QWERTY layout has been used as a business case study in switching cost. Nevertheless, significant market forces can create change, such as in the Turkish adoption of QWERTY. Non-core keys are more prone to change, as they are less frequently used and less subject to the lock-in of touch-typing. The main, alphanumeric portion is typically stable, while symbol keys and shifted key values change somewhat, modifier keys more so, and function keys most of all: QWERTY dates to the No. 1 (1874)—though 1 and 0 were added later—shifted keys date in some cases to the No. 2 (1878), in other cases to the Selectric (1961), and modifier key placement largely dates to the Model M (1985); function key placement typically dates to the Model M, but varies significantly, particularly on laptops.

The earliest mechanical keyboards were used in musical instruments to play particular notes. With the advent of the printing telegraph, a keyboard was needed to select characters. Some of the earliest printing telegraph machines either used a piano keyboard outright or a layout similar to a piano keyboard. The Hughes-Phelps printing telegraph piano keyboard laid keys A–N in left-to-right order on the black piano keys, and keys O–Z in right-to-left order on the white piano keys below.

In countries using the Latin script, the central alphanumeric portion of a modern keyboard is often based upon QWERTY. It was long thought to have been laid out in such a way that common two-letter combinations were placed on opposite sides of the keyboard so that a mechanical keyboard would not jam. However, evidence for this claim has often been contested. In 2012, an argument was advanced by two Japanese historians of technology showing that the key order on the earliest Sholes prototypes in fact followed the left-right and right-left arrangement of the contemporary Hughes-Phelps printing telegraph, described above. Later iterations diverged progressively for various technical reasons, and strong vestiges of the left-right A–N, right-left O–Z arrangement can still be seen in the modern QWERTY layout. Sholes' chief improvement was thus to lay out the keys in rows offset horizontally from each other by three-eighths, three-sixteenths, and three-eighths inches to provide room for the levers and to reduce hand-movement distance. Although it has been demonstrated that the QWERTY layout is not the most efficient layout for typing, it remains the standard.

Sholes chose the size of the keys to be on three-quarter-inch (19 mm) centers. This spacing has turned out to be optimum for fast key entry by the average-size hand, (Note: piano keys are 23.5 millimetres (0.93 in) wide.) and keyboards with this key size are called "full-sized keyboards".

On a manual typewriter, the operator could press the key down with a lighter touch for such characters as the period or comma, which did not occupy as much area on the paper. Since an electric typewriter supplied the force to the typebar itself after the typist merely touched the key, the typewriter itself had to be designed to supply different forces for different characters. To simplify this, the most common layout for electric typewriters in the United States differed from that of the most common layout of manual typewriters. Single-quote and double-quote, instead of being above the keys for the digits 2 and 8, respectively, were placed together on a key of their own. The underscore, another light character, replaced the asterisk above the hyphen.

=== Computer (terminal) keyboards ===
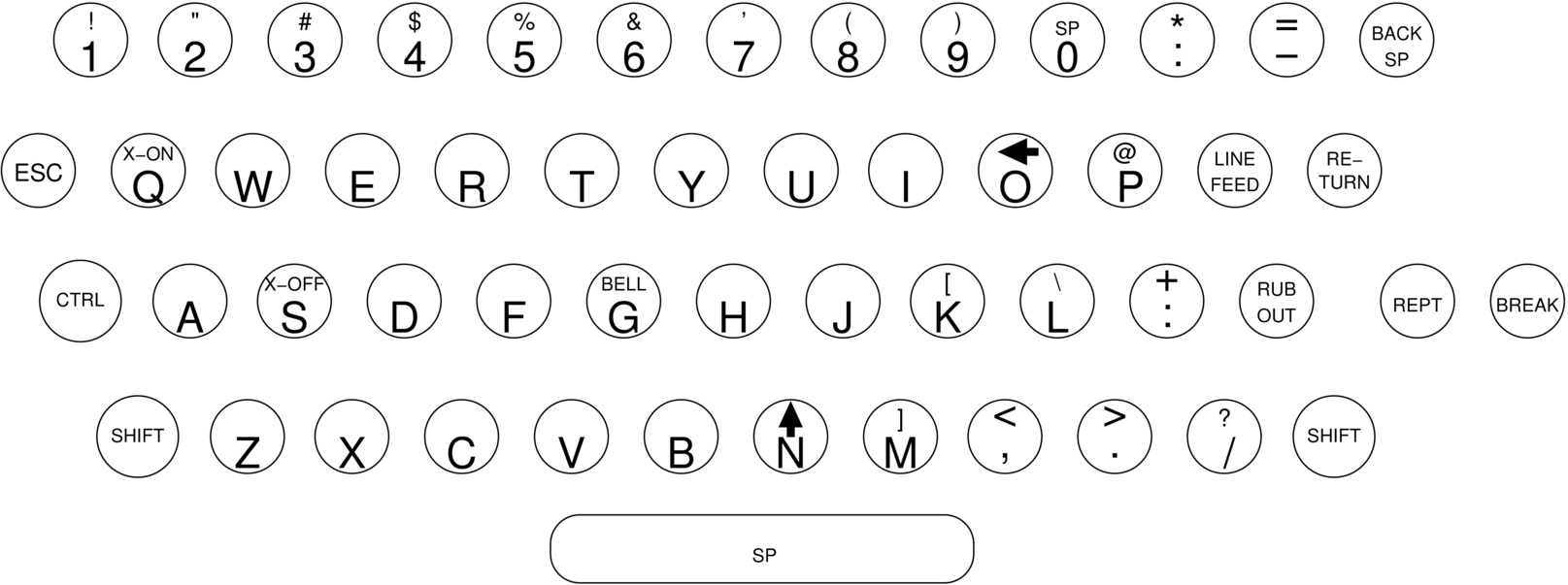
The Teletype Model 33 keyboard is bit-paired

ASCII was designed purposely so that, as much as possible, the layout of standard mechanical typewriters of that time could be duplicated while having the Shift key only flip one bit of the produced code. (Note: For example, the codepoints of the pair ! and 1 are 0021_{16} and 0031_{16} or 100001_{2} and 110001_{2}. The codepoints of A and a are 0041_{16} and 0061_{16} or 1000001_{2} and 1100001_{2}) Some combinations were impossible due to other considerations, so some symbols were moved (in particular the parentheses were moved from 9,0 to 8,9). This type of keyboard is called 'bit paired', examples are the Teletype Model 33 and the ADM-3A.

At the same time, electric typewriters such as the IBM Selectric were making their own changes. For instance they moved the single and double quotes off of shifted numbers to their own shared key, this was done so they could mechanically reduce the striking force for these small glyphs.

As electronics became cheaper, it was soon trivial to make the keys produce any pair of codes, and terminals started matching the IBM Selectric, breaking many of the bit-paired combinations. ASCII symbols that did not exist on typewriters were usually kept on the bit-paired positions, for instance shift+period produces '>'. This layout became known as 'typewriter paired'. Examples are the VT52 and the original IBM PC.

ASCII terminals also added the "Control" shift key, and it flipped a different bit, to turn letters into non-printing "control characters". This bit pairing was preserved in typewriter layout, since users remembered "Type Ctrl+A", not what character they were producing.

IBM added the "Alt" key to the IBM PC as well. Though there were many attempts to add another shift key before this, it finally established a standard name and location.

The VT220 popularized a layout where there were independent cursor keys arranged in an upside-down T, and gaps between the typewriter, cursor, and numeric keypads. IBM adopted the 101/102 key layout on the PS/2 in 1987 making this layout pretty much standard.

Many modern keyboards follow the layout specifications contained in parts 1, 2, and 5 of the international standard series ISO/IEC 9995. These specifications were first defined by the user group at AFNOR in 1984 working under the direction of Alain Souloumiac. Based on this work, an ergonomic expert wrote a report which was adopted at the ISO Berlin meeting in 1985 and became a reference for keyboard layouts.

In 1994, Microsoft added two Windows keys and a Menu key to the bottom row on the Natural Keyboard.

Many keyboards have added custom keys, knobs, or other input devices, which can be used for various multimedia, utility, or gaming functions. None of these have become any widely used standard. The addition of another shift key called "Fn" has shown some popularity.

== Physical, visual, and functional terminology ==
The layout of a keyboard may refer to its physical design (arrangement of keys), visual appearance (physical labeling of keys), or functions (software response to a key press or release).

=== Physical layouts ===
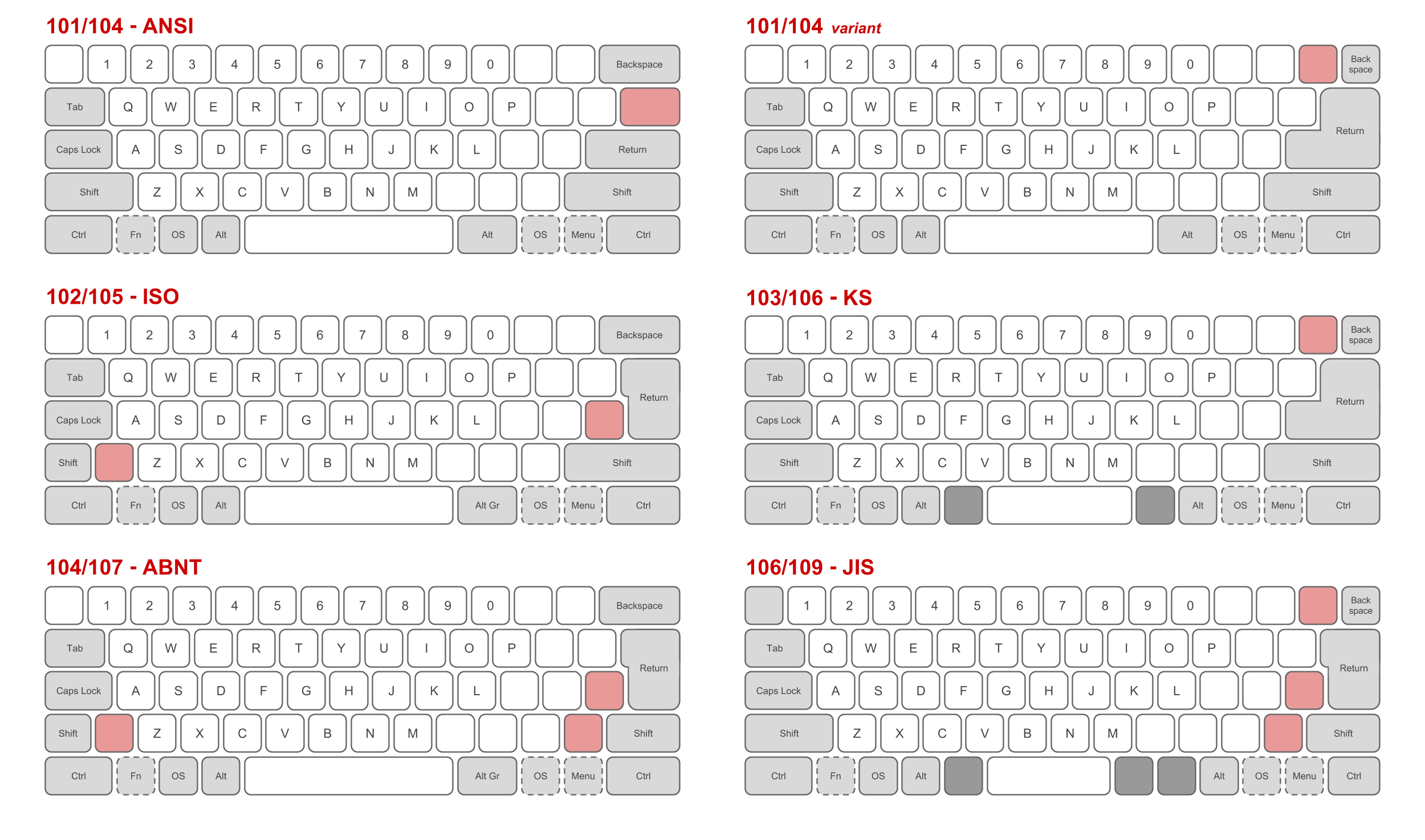
A comparison of common physical layouts. The ISO-standard physical layout (center left) is common, e.g., in the United Kingdom. Compared with the ANSI layout (top left), the enter key is vertical rather than horizontal. In addition, the left shift key is smaller, to make room for an additional key to its right. The JIS physical layout (bottom right) is the basis for Japanese keyboards. Here it is the right-hand shift key that is smaller. Furthermore, the space bar and backspace key are also smaller, to make room for four additional keys.

Physical layouts only address tangible differences among keyboards. When a key is pressed, the keyboard does not send a message such as the A-key is depressed but rather the left-most main key of the home row is depressed. (Technically, each key has an internal reference number, the scan code, and these numbers are what is sent to the computer when a key is pressed or released.) The keyboard and the computer each have no information about what is marked on that key, and it could equally well be the letter A or the digit 9. Historically, the user of the computer was requested to identify the functional layout of the keyboard when installing or customizing the operating system. Modern USB keyboards are plug-and-play; they communicate their visual layout to the OS when connected (though the user is still able to reset this at will).

Today, most keyboards use one of three different physical layouts, usually referred to as simply ISO (ISO/IEC 9995-2), ANSI (ANSI-INCITS 154-1988), and JIS (JIS X 6002-1980), referring roughly to the organizations issuing the relevant worldwide, United States, and Japanese standards, respectively. (In fact, the physical layouts referred to as "ISO" and "ANSI" comply with the primary recommendations in the named standards, while each of these standards in fact also allows the other.) Keyboard layout in this sense may refer either to this broad categorization or to finer distinctions within these categories. For example, as of May 2008, Apple Inc. produces ISO, ANSI, and JIS desktop keyboards, each in both extended and compact forms. The extended keyboards have 110, 109, and 112 keys (ISO, ANSI, and JIS, respectively), and the compact models have 79, 78, and 80.

=== Visual layouts ===
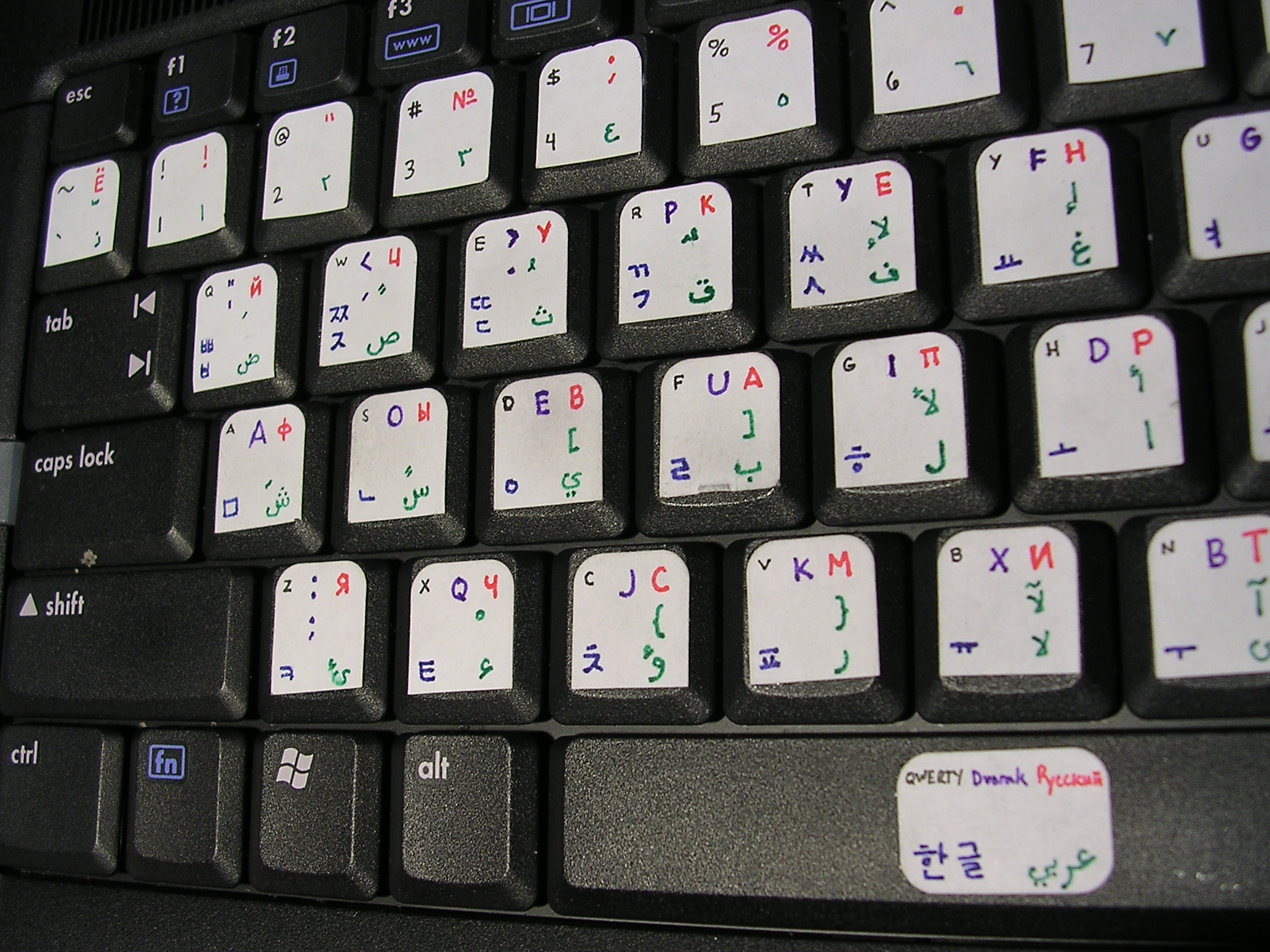
A visual layout consisting of both factory-printed symbols and customized stickers

The visual layout includes the symbols printed on the physical keycaps. Visual layouts vary by language, country, and user preference, and any one physical and functional layout can be employed with a number of different visual layouts. For example, the "ISO" keyboard layout is used throughout Europe, but typical French, German, and UK variants of physically identical keyboards appear different because they bear different legends on their keys. Even blank keyboards—with no legends—are sometimes used to learn typing skills or by user preference.

Some users choose to attach custom labels on top of their keycaps. This can be, e.g., for masking foreign layouts, adding additional information such as shortcuts, learning aids, gaming controls, or solely for decorative purposes.

=== Functional layouts ===
The functional layout of the keyboard refers to the mapping between a physical key (such as the A key) and a consequent software event (such as the letter "A" appearing on the screen). Usually, the functional layout is set (in the system configuration) to match the visual layout of the keyboard being used, so that pressing a key will produce the expected result, corresponding to the legends on the keyboard. However, most operating systems have software (such as the language bar in Microsoft Windows) that allows the user to easily switch between functional layouts. For example, a user with a Swedish keyboard who wishes to type more easily in German may switch to a functional layout intended for German—without regard to key markings. A touch typist skilled in the use of another language layout can use a keyboard with English-language legends if it is remapped to their familiar layout, because they rarely look at the keyboard when typing.

==== Customized functional layouts ====
Functional layouts can be redefined or customized within the operating system by reconfiguring the operating system keyboard driver, or with the use of a separate software application, or by transliteration (where letters in another language get mapped to visible Latin letters on the keyboard by the way they sound).

Mixed hardware-to-software keyboard extensions exist to overcome the above discrepancies between functional and visual layouts. A keyboard overlay is a plastic or paper masks that can be placed over the empty space between the keys, providing the user with the functional use of various keys. Alternatively, a user applies keyboard stickers with an extra imprinted language alphabet and adds another keyboard layout via language support options in the operating system. The visual layout of any keyboard can also be changed by simply replacing its keys or attaching labels to them, such as to change an English-language keyboard from the common QWERTY to the Dvorak layout, although for touch typists, the placement of the tactile bumps on the home keys is of more practical importance than that of the visual markings.

In the past, complex software that mapped many non-standard functions to the keys (such as a flight simulator) would be shipped with a "keyboard overlay", a large sheet of paper with pre-cut holes matching the key layout of a particular model of computer. When placed over the keyboard, the overlay provided a quick visual reference as to what each key's new function was, without blocking the keys or permanently modifying their appearance. The overlay was often made from good-quality laminated paper and was designed to fold up and fit in the game's packaging when not in use.

==== National variants ====
The U.S. national standard keyboard has 104 keys, while the PC keyboards for most other countries have 105 keys. In an operating system configured for a non-English language, the keys are placed differently. For example, keyboards designed for typing in Spanish have some characters shifted to make room for Ñ/ñ; similarly, those for French or Portuguese may have a special key for the character Ç/ç. Keyboards designed for Japanese may have special keys to switch between Japanese and Latin scripts, and the character ¥ (yen and yuan sign) instead of \ (backslash – which itself additionally may be displayed as a ¥ or a ₩ in some renditions). Using the same keyboard for alternative languages leads to a conflict: the image on the key may not correspond to the character displayed on screen because of different keyboard mappings. In such cases, each new language may require an additional label on the key, because the national standard keyboard layouts may not share similar characters of different languages or even lay them out in different ways.

The United States keyboard layout is used as the default in some Linux distributions.

Most operating systems allow switching between functional keyboard layouts, using a key combination involving register keys that are not used for normal operations (e.g. Microsoft reserve Alt+⇧ Shift or Ctrl+⇧ Shift register control keys for sequential layout switching; those keys were inherited from old DOS keyboard drivers). There are keyboards with two parallel sets of characters labeled on the keys, representing alternate alphabets or scripts. It is also possible to add a second set of characters to a keyboard with keyboard stickers manufactured by third parties.

=== Size variation ===
Sections on a full-size 104-key keyboard. Percentages and relevant values of keys show the presence of keys at common sizes.

Most modern keyboards contain a standard number of total keys according to a specific form factor. This is often denoted by key count or grouped by an approximate percentage. Full-size or 100% keyboards are commonly described as 104 or 105-key, up to 108-key. Individual keys or entire sections are often skipped for compactness or by personal preference, such as TKL (Tenkeyless) or 80% which excludes the number pad, 75% which omits lesser used navigation or system keys, 60% which eliminates the function row and navigation keys, and 40% which removes the number row as well. Smaller keyboards are designed to increase portability or desk space, and reduce hand motions. They often map the missing function, symbol, or number keys to layers or other combinations, through customizable configuration.

== Conventional Latin-script ==
Although there are a large number of keyboard layouts used for languages written with Latin-script alphabets, most of these layouts are quite similar. They can be divided into three main families according to where the A, M, Q, W, Y and Z keys are placed on the keyboard. These layouts are usually named after the first six letters on the first row: AZERTY, QWERTY, QWERTZ, QZERTY and national variants thereof.

While the central area of the keyboard, the alphabetic section, remains fairly constant, and the numbers from 1–9 are almost invariably on the row above, keyboards may differ in:

- the placement of punctuation, typographic and other special characters, and which of these characters are included,
- whether numbers are accessible directly or in a shift-state,
- the presence and placement of letters with diacritics (in some layouts, diacritics are applied using dead keys but these are rarely engraved).
- the presence and placement of a row of function keys above the number row
- the presence and placement of one or two Alt keys, an AltGr key or Option key, a backspace or delete key, a control key or command key, a compose key, an Esc key, and OS-specific keys like the Windows key.

The physical keyboard is of the basic ISO, ANSI, or JIS type; pressing a key sends a scan code to the operating-system or other software, which in turn determines the character to be generated: this arrangement is known as the keyboard mapping. It is customary for keyboards to be engraved appropriately to the local default mapping. For example, when the ⇧ Shift and numeric 2 keys are pressed simultaneously on a US keyboard, "@" is generated, and the key is engraved appropriately. On a UK keyboard this key combination generates the double-quote character, and UK keyboards are so engraved.

In the keyboard charts listed below, the primary letters or characters available with each alphanumeric key are often shown in black in the left half of the key, whereas characters accessed using the AltGr key appear in blue in the right half of the corresponding key. Symbols representing dead keys usually appear in red.

=== QWERTY ===
ANSI QWERTY keyboard layout (US)

The QWERTY layout is, by far, the most widespread layout in use, and the only one that is not confined to a particular geographical area. In some territories, keys like ↵ Enter and ⇪ Caps Lock are not translated to the language of the territory in question. In other varieties, such keys have been translated, like ↵ Intro and ⇪ Bloq Mayús, on Spanish computer keyboards, respectively, for the example above. On Macintosh computers, these keys are usually just represented by symbols without the word "Enter", "Shift", "Command", "Option/Alt" or "Control", except keyboards distributed in the US and East Asia.

Extended keyboard mappings, such as the United Kingdom (Extended) Layout or the US-International layout, use the as-supplied keyboard but add extra facilities to the basic keyboard software. This change provides as many as four different effects for each key.

=== ÄWERTY (Turkmen) ===
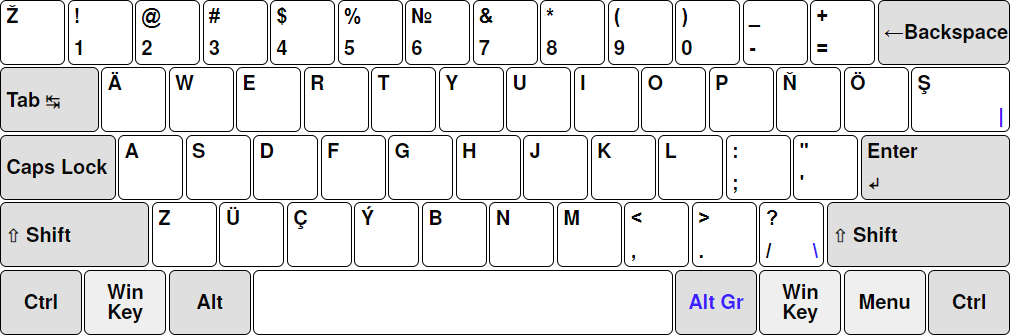
Turkmen ÄWERTY keyboard layout

Turkmen keyboards use a layout known as ÄWERTY (/æˈvɜːrtiː/ av-UR-tee), where Ä appears in place of Q above A, Ü appears in place of X below S, Ç appears in place of C, and Ý appears in place of V, with C, Q, V, and X not being accessible at all. It is supported by Microsoft Windows (Vista and later only).

=== AZERTY ===
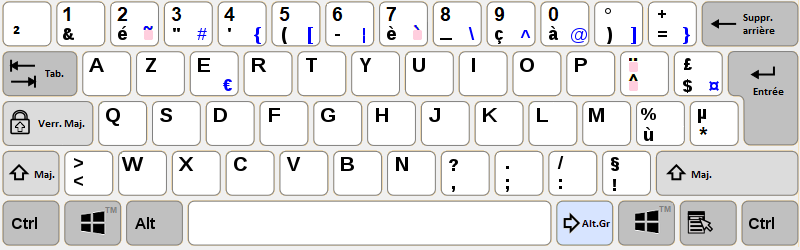
French AZERTY layout

The AZERTY layout is used in France, Belgium, and some African countries. It differs from the QWERTY layout thus:

- A and Q are swapped,
- Z and W are swapped,
- M is moved to the right of L, (taking the place of the :/; or colon/semicolon key on a US keyboard),
- The digits 0 to 9 are on the same keys, but to be typed the shift key must be pressed. The unshifted positions are used for accented characters,
- Caps lock is replaced by Shift lock, thus affecting non-letter keys as well. However, there is an ongoing evolution towards a Caps lock key instead of a Shift lock.

=== ĄŽERTY (Lithuanian) ===
As standardized in LST 1582, Lithuanian keyboards have a defined layout known as ĄŽERTY, where Ą appears in place of Q above A, Ž in place of W above S, and Ū in place of X below S, with Q, W, and X being available either on the far right-hand side or by use of the AltGr key. However, instead of ĄŽERTY, the Lithuanian QWERTY keyboard is universally used.

=== QÜERTY (Azerbaijani) ===
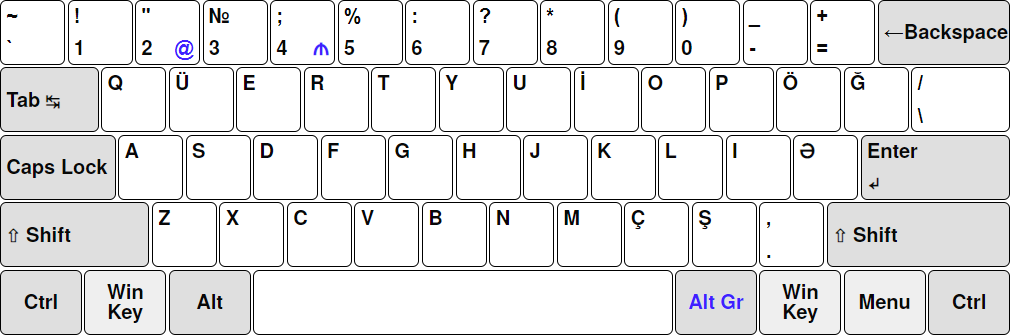
Azerbaijani QÜERTY keyboard layout

Azerbaijani keyboards use a layout known as QÜERTY, where Ü appears in place of W above S, with W not being accessible at all. It is supported by Microsoft Windows.

=== QWERTY (Vietnamese) ===
Vietnamese keyboard layout

The Vietnamese keyboard layout is an extended Latin QWERTY layout. The letters Ă, Â, Ê, and Ô are found on what would be the number keys 1–4 on the US English keyboard, with 5–9 producing the tonal marks (grave accent, hook, tilde, acute accent and dot below, in that order), 0 producing Đ, = producing the đồng sign (₫) when not shifted, and brackets ([, ]) producing Ư and Ơ. In practice, most Vietnamese text is entered using input method editors rather than relying solely on a physical layout. The three most common Vietnamese input methods are Telex, VNI, and VIQR:

- Telex - a letter-combination based method widely used in Vietnam; diacritics and special letters are produced by typing additional letters or letter combinations after the base vowel (for example, aa → â, aw → ă, and as → á).
- VNI - a number-based method that appends digits to a base vowel to indicate diacritics and produce special letters (for example, a6 → â, a1 → á).
- VIQR (Vietnamese Quoted-Readable) - an older ASCII-based convention that uses punctuation sequences for diacritics (for example, a^ → â, a' → á); VIQR was widely used when systems lacked native Unicode/IME support and remains in use in some legacy contexts.

Modern operating systems and mobile platforms (Windows, macOS, Linux, Android, iOS) commonly provide built-in or downloadable support for Telex and VNI IMEs, and predictive text and candidate selection assist with disambiguation when multiple syllables share the same letter sequence.

=== QWERTZ ===
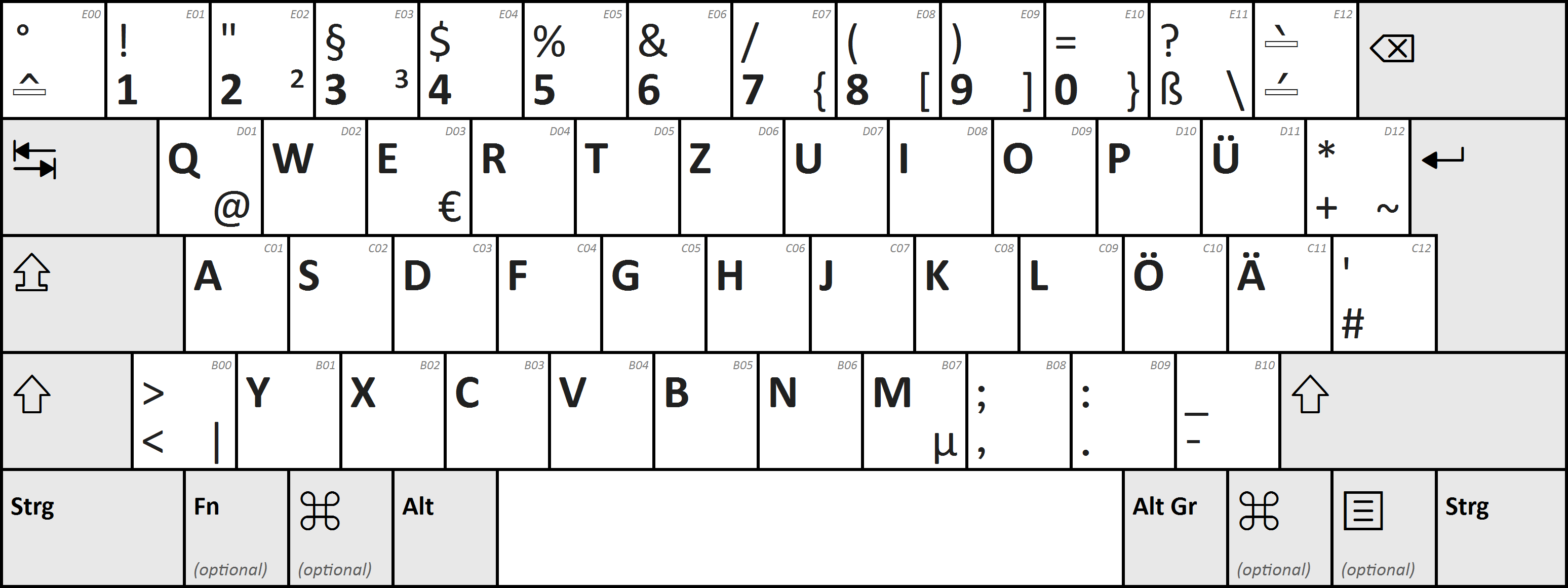
German QWERTZ layout

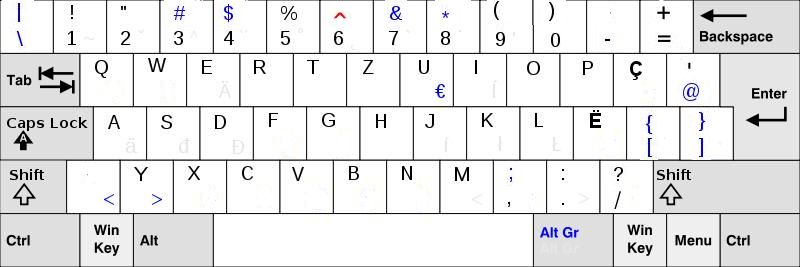
Albanian QWERTZ keyboard

The QWERTZ layout is the normal keyboard layout in Germany, Austria and Switzerland. It is also fairly widely used in Czechia, Slovakia and other parts of Central Europe. The main difference between it and QWERTY is that Y and Z are swapped, and some special characters, such as brackets, are replaced by diacritical characters like Ä, Ö, Ü, ß. In Czechia and Slovakia, diacritical characters like Ě, Š, Č, Ř, Ž, Ý, Á, Í also replace numbers. Caps lock can be a shift lock as in AZERTY (see above).

=== QZERTY ===
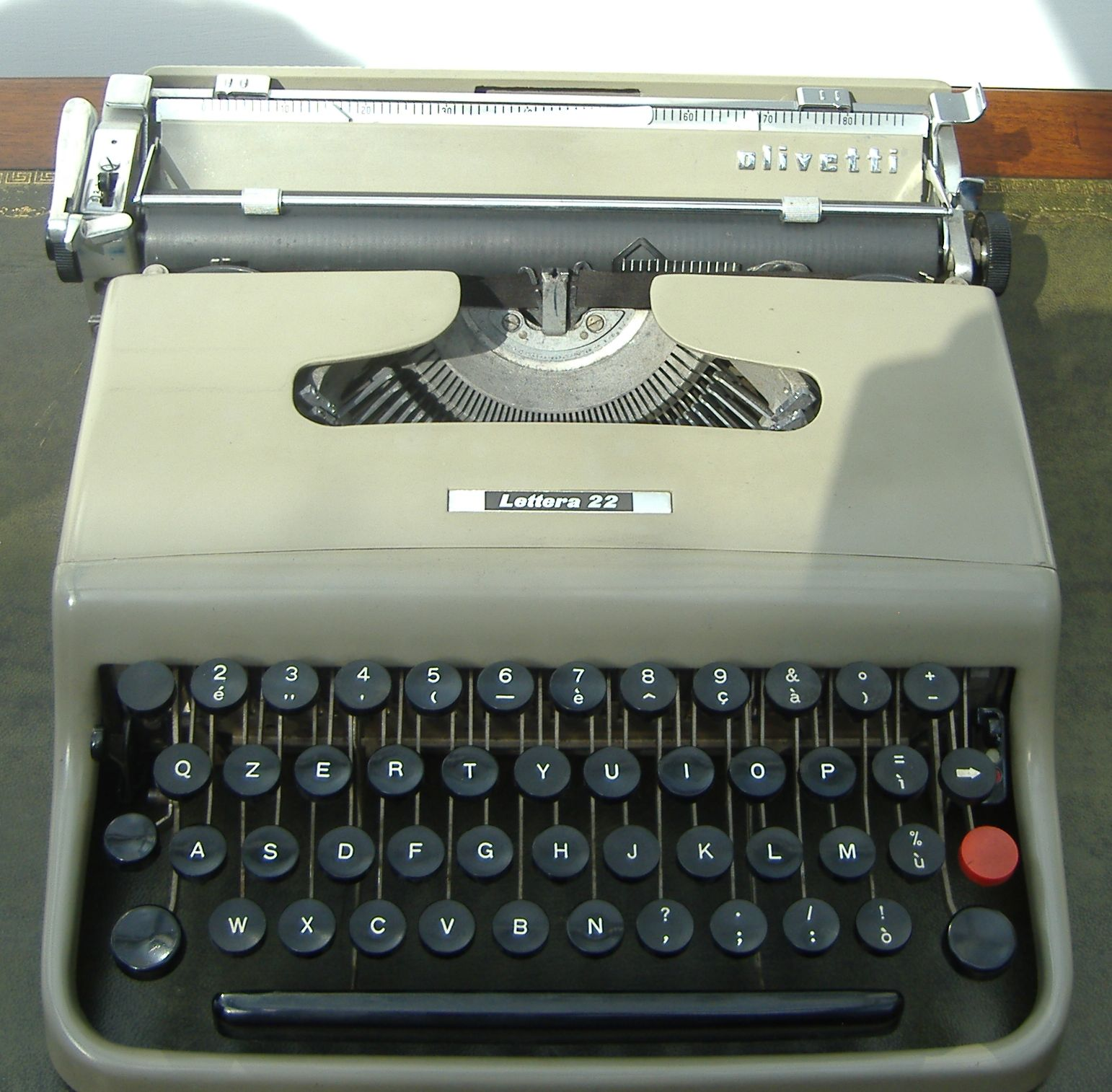
Italian typewriter Olivetti Lettera 22

The QZERTY layout was the traditional typewriter layout in Italy. In recent years, a modified QWERTY layout with keys for letters with diacritics such as ⟨à, è, ò⟩ has gained widespread usage throughout Italy. Computer keyboards usually have QWERTY, although non-alphanumeric characters vary.

- Z and W are swapped
- M is moved from the right of N to the right of L, as in AZERTY
- Number keys are shifted

Apple supported QZERTY layout in its early Italian keyboards, as well as on the iPod Touch.

=== Sámi Extended ===
Sámi keyboards use a layout known as the Sámi Extended, where Á appears in place of Q above A, Š appears in place of W above S, Č appears in place of X to the left of C, and Ŧ appears in place of Y to the right of T, with Q, W, X, and Y being available by use of the AltGr key. Also, Å is to the right of P (to match the Norwegian and Swedish/Finnish keyboards), Ŋ is to the right of Å, and Đ is to the right of Ŋ. It is different in Norway than in Sweden and Finland, because of the placement of the letters different between Norwegian and Swedish/Finnish (Ä, Æ, Ö, and Ø), which are placed where they match the standard keyboard for the main language spoken in the country. It is supported by Microsoft Windows (Windows XP SP2 and later only). Microsoft Windows also has Swedish with Sami, Norwegian with Sami and Finnish with Sami layouts, which match the normal Swedish, Norwegian, or Finnish keyboards, but has additional Sami characters as AltGr-combinations.

== Other Latin-script ==
There are also keyboard layouts that have less resemblance to traditional typewriter layouts. These are designed to reduce finger movement and overuse, and proponents claim can increase typing speeds and improve ergonomics.

=== Dvorak ===
The Dvorak keyboard layout

The Dvorak layout was invented by August Dvorak in the 1930s. It has been adapted for languages other than English, and also has single-handed variants. The layout is included in major operating systems. Dvorak originally had a rearranged number row, but the present layout places them in the standard order. It was designed to improve upon QWERTY for typing speed and comfort, and decrease errors. One study found a 4% average increase in speed for a small group of typists. The layout concentrates the most frequent English letters in the home row, with 70% row utilization (compared to 32% for QWERTY).

Despite its historical popularity, several letters are not efficiently placed compared to newer layouts. For example, the right pinky has high movement due to the bigrams ls and sl (as in also, last, island, slightly), and the left index finger has heavy usage (including a stretch for the letter i). Additionally, this can be seen in the command ls -l, which uses 4 keystrokes by the right pinky finger, plus a lateral stretch for the hyphen.

The layout predates the invention of computers, and unlike Colemak, keyboard shortcuts (such as copy-paste) were not a design consideration. Punctuation symbols differ from QWERTY, with 4 keys placed on the left side instead.

=== Colemak ===
Colemak keyboard layout (US)

The Colemak layout is currently the third most popular alternative to QWERTY in the English-speaking world, and it has some similarities while making several improvements. The original version is included in major operating systems.

The layout uses QWERTY as a base, changing the positions of 17 keys while retaining the positions of most non-alphabetic characters and several keyboard shortcuts. It supposedly provides more familiarity than Dvorak for those accustomed to QWERTY while also improving efficiency. It shares several design goals with the Dvorak layout, such as minimizing finger path distance and increasing home row utilization. A defining but optional feature of Colemak is re-binding the caps lock key due to lower average usage, replacing it with an additional backspace key to reduce travel distance of the pinky fingers.

Several Colemak variants exist. Colemak Mod-DH (or Colemak-DH, formerly Colemak Mod-DHm) reduces reliance on the index fingers in the middle-row centre-column keys (D and H), which create awkward lateral hand movements for common English bigrams such as he and eh. The design process behind Colemak Mod-DH employed, among other analysis factors, an "effort grid", showing the relative effort involved in typing each key.

Colemak and its modifications also inspired some newer layouts such as Canary and others utilizing algorithmic optimization methods. Other modifications seek additional compatibility with other functions or layouts, such as Miryoku, a version of Colemak-DH adapted for split ergonomic keyboards by utilizing home-row mods and 6 thumb keys.

=== Workman ===
Workman layout for the English language, showing home keys highlighted

Workman is an English layout created in 2010. It is included in the Linux operating system.

The design hypothesizes about the preferred movement of each finger rather than assuming the bottom letter row is the least accessible. It says each index finger prefers to curl inward rather than stretch outward, so the second-preferred position goes to the bottom row rather than the top. It contrasts this with the middle and ring fingers, saying they are relatively long and prefer to stretch out instead. Using this principle, the layout weights each key, rather than each row as a whole.

Additionally, it theorizes that it is more natural to curl or stretch fingers rather than rotate the entire wrist inwards or outwards. The design assigns a lower priority to the two inner columns between the home keys (containing G and H on QWERTY), similarly to the Colemak-DH or "Curl" mods. Usage is balanced between the left and right hands.

The Workman layout claims to achieve overall less finger travel distance for the English language than even Colemak. However, it has higher frequencies of same-finger n-grams, where one finger hits two keys in succession, than other layouts.

=== Other English layouts ===
There are many other alternative layouts for English, developed through different principles and methods.

==== 2000 - Present ====
Multiple new layouts have gained popularity in online typing communities in the 2020s including Graphite, Gallium, Canary, Sturdy, and Semimak. These layouts are included for emulation on the typing websites Monkeytype and keybr. These layouts can be very fast, for example, Semimak has been typed at speeds over 200 words per minute (wpm) by several typists, including its creator, with its fastest speed currently recorded on video being 238 wpm.

Some layouts created between 2000 and 2020 were Asset, Arensito, Minimak, Norman, Qwpr, Workman, Halmak, symmetric layouts (balancing usage of the left and right hands) such as Niro and Soul, and the thumb-alpha layout RSTHD.

Norman, like Workman, deprioritizes the central columns but gives more load to the right hand with the assumption that the right hand is more capable than the left. It also gives importance to retaining letters in the same position or at least the same finger as QWERTY.

BEAKL was proposed in 2016 and has since undergone a number of revisions. These layouts are designed under the premise that the pinkies are weaker, slower and less comfortable to type than the other fingers, even for those keys on the home row. The use of pinkies and inside index columns is minimized. Instead of a home row, BEAKL emphasizes the "home block", consisting of the index, middle and ring fingers on the top, home, and bottom rows; these nine keys are where the most common letters and some punctuation marks are placed. Like Colemak Mod-DH, BEAKL employs an "effort grid" in its layout analysis; due to its non-traditional view of finger effort, the grid's relative values are markedly different from those of Colemak Mod-DH.

As of 2018, MTGAP claimed the lowest finger travel for a standard keyboard, and travel distance for an ergonomic keyboard second only to Arensito's keyboard layout.

Engram was proposed in 2021 and revised in 2025. It claims to reduce lateral finger movements and to provide more efficient typing of high-frequency letter pairs. The six most common punctuation marks are grouped together in the middle columns.

Some layouts have less key deviation from QWERTY, aiming to help increase typing speed and ergonomics with minimal relearning of keys.

===== Thumb Alpha =====
Several other new layouts inspired by non-standard keyboards (such as split keyboards) have been designed, such as thumb alpha, placing an alphabet key (commonly, R and S) on the bottom row in order to utilise the thumb not being used to press spacebar or other modifier keys. One of the first designs of this was Malt by Maltron, and a later design using this concept was RTSHD in 2016, which was based on additional metrics other than letter distance. This has been featured in multiple new layouts such as Night.

===== Qwpr =====
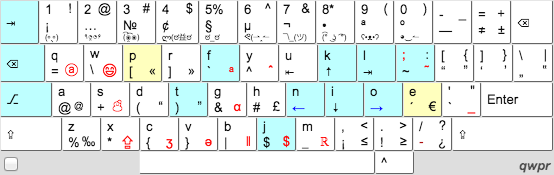
Qwpr keyboard layout (letters moved from QWERTY in teal, or yellow if different hand)

Qwpr is a layout that changes only 11 basic keys from their QWERTY positions, with only 2 keys typed with different fingers. Minimak has versions that changes four, six, eight, or twelve keys; all have only 3 keys that change finger. These intend to offer much of the reduced finger movement of Dvorak without the steep learning curve and with an increased ability to remain proficient with a QWERTY keyboard. The Qwpr layout is also designed for programmers and multilingual users, as it uses Caps Lock as a "punctuation shift", offering quicker access to ASCII symbols and arrow keys, as well as to 15 dead keys for typing hundreds of different glyphs such as accented characters, mathematical symbols, or emoji.

===== Alphabetical layouts =====
A few companies offer "ABC" (alphabetical) layout keyboards. The ABCDEF layout was used by Minitel. The layout can also be useful for people who do not type often or where using both hands is not practical, such as touchscreens.

==== Older layouts ====
===== Sholes' 2nd Layout =====
Sholes' second layout

Christopher Latham Sholes, inventor of the QWERTY layout, created his own alternative, and patented it in 1896. Similar to Dvorak, he placed all the vowels on the home row, but in this case on the right hand. The layout is right-hand biased with both the vowels and many of the most common consonants on the right side of the layout.

===== Blickensderfer =====
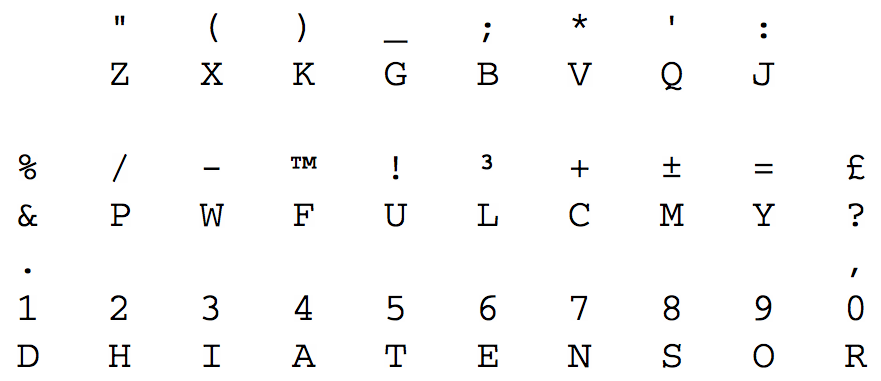
Original Blickensderfer keyboard

The Blickensderfer typewriter, designed by George Canfield Blickensderfer in 1892, was known for its novel keyboard layout, its interchangeable font, and its suitability for travel. The Blickensderfer keyboard had three banks (rows of keys), with special characters being entered using a separate Shift key; the home row was, uniquely, the bottom one (i.e., the typist kept her hands on the bottom row). A computer or standard typewriter keyboard, on the other hand, has four banks of keys, with the home row being second from bottom.

=== French ===
There have been several layouts designed for French. In Canada, the CSA keyboard is designed to write several languages, especially French.

=== BÉPO ===
BÉPO keyboard layout

The BÉPO layout is an optimized French keyboard layout developed by the BÉPO community, supporting all Latin-based alphabets of the European Union, Greek and Esperanto. It is based on ideas from the Dvorak and other ergonomic layouts. Typing with it is usually easier due to the high-frequency keys being in the home row. Typing tutors exist for practice.

In 2019, a slightly modified version of the BÉPO layout is featured in a French standard developed by AFNOR, along with an improved version of the traditional AZERTY layout.

==== Dvorak-fr ====
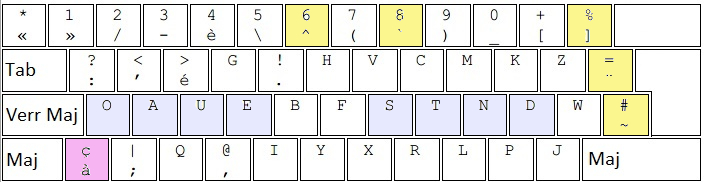
Dvorak-fr

The Dvorak-fr layout is a Dvorak-like layout specific to the French language, without concession to the use of programming languages, and published in 2002 by Francis Leboutte. Version 2 was released in June 2020. Its design meets the need to maximize comfort and prevent risks when typing in French.

Unlike AZERTY, the characters needed for good French typography are easily accessible: for example, the quotation marks («») and the curved apostrophe are available directly. More than 150 additional characters are available via dead keys.

=== JCUKEN (Latin) ===
JCUKEN keyboard of the UKNC computer

The JCUKEN layout was used in the USSR for all 8-bit computers (both domestically produced and imported such as Japan-made MSX-compatible systems) due to its technical simplicity when used in conjunction with KOI-7 encoding. The punctuations and non-letter symbols are bit-paired, with symbols not being overridden in KOI-7 on the same keys for both Latin and Cyrillic mode.

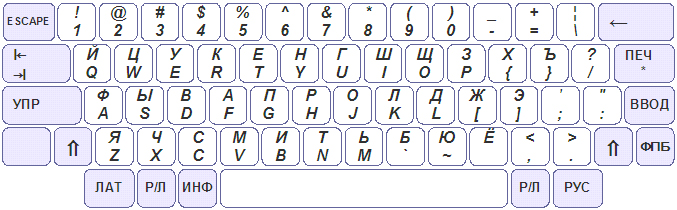
ES1845 JCUKEN-QWERTY hybrid layout keyboard

Cloned IBM-compatibles such as ES 1845 or ES PEVM typically use JCUKEN for Cyrillic mode and QWERTY for Latin, as is also specified in GOST 14289-88.

8-bit computers produced in the ex-USSR states after its dissolution sometimes use a Russian phonetic layout.

=== Neo ===
Neo Layout, layer 1

The Neo layout is an optimized German keyboard layout developed in 2004 by the Neo Users Group, supporting nearly all Latin-based alphabets, including the International Phonetic Alphabet, the Vietnamese language and some African languages.

The positions of the letters are not only optimized for German letter frequency, but also for typical groups of two or three letters. English is considered a major target as well. The design tries to enforce the alternating usage of both hands to increase typing speed. It is based on ideas from de-ergo and other ergonomic layouts. The high-frequency keys are placed in the home row. The current layout, Neo 2.0, has unique features not present in other layouts, making it suited for many target groups such as programmers, mathematicians, scientists or LaTeX authors. Neo is grouped in different layers, each designed for a special purpose.

Neo Layout, layer 3

Most special characters inherit the meaning of the lower layers—the ⟨¿⟩ character is one layer above the ⟨?⟩, or the Greek ⟨α⟩ is above the ⟨a⟩ character. Neo uses a total of six layers with the following general use:

1. Lowercase characters
2. Uppercase characters, typographical characters
3. Special characters for programming, etc.
4. WASD-like movement keys and number block
5. Greek characters
6. Mathematical symbols and Greek uppercase characters

=== Turkish (F-keyboard) ===
Turkish F-keyboard layout

The Turkish F-keyboard is a keyboard layout, customised for the Turkish language. Despite the greater efficiency of the Turkish F-keyboard, however, the modified QWERTY keyboard ("Q-keyboard") is the one that is used on most computers in Turkey.

The Turkish language uses the Turkish alphabet, and a dedicated keyboard layout was designed in 1955 under the leadership of İhsan Sıtkı Yener. During its development, letter frequencies in the Turkish language were investigated with the aid of Turkish Language Association. A significant feature of the F-keyboard is its organization based on letter frequency in Turkish words. For instance, the most frequently used consonant at that time, "K," is positioned under the right index finger, while the most common vowel, "A," is placed under the left index finger. This arrangement enhances accessibility to the most used letters, thus improving typing speed and ergonomics. Moreover, the least frequently used letter in Turkish, "J," is assigned to the weakest finger on the left hand, the little finger. In contrast, on the QWERTY keyboard (even in the modified Turkish QWERTY layout), the "J" key occupies a central position, which is more valuable for frequently used letters. This positioning on QWERTY keyboards thus reduces efficiency when typing in Turkish.

=== ŪGJRMV ===
Latvian Keyboard Layout

The ŪGJRMV layout, also known as the "Ergonomic" layout, was the national keyboard of Latvia. It is specifically designed for the Latvian language. The letter arrangement in this layout is quite different from the standard QWERTY, with only two letters in the same position and five more in the same row and layer. While it may work well for typing in Latvian, there are issues, particularly with symbols. Some errors from the QWERTY layout remain, and new ones have been introduced, such as the placement of curly braces. The layout uses a cedilla instead of the correct diacritic comma due to a Unicode limitation, affecting both this and the QWERTY layout, especially for writing in Livonian. Microsoft's implementations of these layouts have some differences, with the ŪGJRMV layout containing an error on the F key in the number row.

=== PÜŞUD (Azerbaijani) ===
In 2010, a new layout – known as PÜŞUD – was designed and proposed by Azerbaijan National Academy of Sciences. It was praised by Ministry of Digital Development and Transportation. This layout is completely different than the most used one – QÜERTY.

=== Chorded keyboards ===
Chorded keyboards, such as the Stenotype and Velotype, allow letters and words to be entered using combinations of keys in a single stroke. Users of stenotype machines regularly reach rates of 225 words per minute. These systems are commonly used for real-time transcription by court reporters and in live closed captioning systems. Ordinary keyboards may be adapted for this purpose using Plover. However, due to hardware constraints, chording three or more keys may not work as expected. Many high-end keyboards support n-key rollover and so do not have this limitation.

=== Mobile devices ===
Some layouts have also been designed specifically for use with mobile devices. The FITALY layout is optimized for use with a stylus, places the most commonly used letters closest to the centre and thus minimizes the distance travelled when entering words. A similar concept was followed to research and develop the MessagEase keyboard layout for fast text entry with stylus or finger. The ATOMIK layout, designed for stylus use, was developed by IBM using the Metropolis Algorithm to mathematically minimize the movement necessary to spell words in English. The ATOMIK keyboard layout is an alternative to QWERTY in ShapeWriter's WritingPad software. ASETNIOP is a keyboard layout designed for tablet computers that uses 10 input points, eight of them on the home row.

The multi-touch screens of mobile devices allow implementation of virtual on-screen chorded keyboards. Buttons are fewer, so they can be made larger. Symbols on the keys can be changed dynamically depending on what other keys are pressed, thus eliminating the need to memorize combos for characters and functions before use. For example, in the chorded GKOS keyboard which has been adapted for the Google Android, Apple iPhone, MS Windows Phone, and Intel MeeGo/Harmattan platforms, thumbs are used for chording by pressing one or two keys at the same time. The layout divides the keys into two separate pads which are positioned near the sides of the screen, while text appears in the middle. The most frequent letters have dedicated keys and do not require chording.

==== Hexagon ====
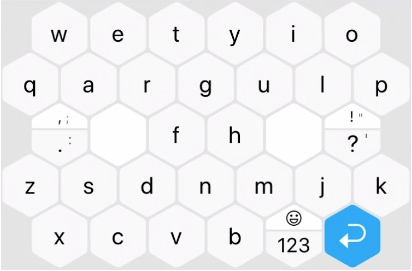
Hexagon keyboard layout

The honeycomb layout has hexagon keys and was invented by Typewise in cooperation with the ETH Zurich in 2015 for smartphones. It exists for 40+ languages including English, German, Spanish, French and Afrikaans. The keys are arranged like those of the respective traditional keyboard with a few changes. Instead of the Space bar there are two smaller space bars in the middle of the keyboard. The ⇧ Shift is replaced by swiping up on the keys and ← Backspace by swiping to the left on the keyboard. Diacritic characters can be accessed by holding on a key.

=== Layout design and configuration ===
United-States Maltron 3D keyboard layout

The design of alternative keyboard layouts is ongoing. However, adoption is limited because of the predominance of better-known layouts and the requirement of additional setup.

Common optimizations include: increasing home row usage, minimizing finger movement and awkward motions, balancing finger usage to prevent overuse, alternation between hands, and inward or outward rolls (where one hand types successive letters in one direction). Several designs reduce the changes from QWERTY to ease the learning curve, though some suggest this prevents ergonomic optimization.

Several open-source analysis programs to create and analyse keyboard layouts have been created, including the browser-based Cyanophage and the programs Oxeylyzer (in active development) and Genkey. The browser-based design tool Ergogen can be used to generate custom hardware layouts to plan the PCB and layout design of ergonomic keyboards.

Custom layouts can be used or created using software such as Kanata (open source, for Linux, MacOS, Windows), Karabiner-Elements (open-source, macOS) and older programs such as Microsoft Keyboard Layout Creator (basic editor, free, Windows), SIL Ukelele (advanced editor, free, macOS), KbdEdit (commercial editor, Windows) and Keyman Developer (free and open source, for Windows, macOS, iOS, Android, and virtual website keyboards). These make it easy to customize layouts for keyboards that do not have customizable firmware. Users may accommodate their own typing patterns or needs by creating new layouts from scratch (like the IPA or pan-Iberian layouts) or modify existing ones (for example, the Latin American Extended or Gaelic layouts). Such editors can also construct complex key sequences using dead keys or the AltGr key.

Some keyboards offer firmware that allows the flexibility to reprogram keyboard layouts and functions. Open-source firmware such as QMK and ZMK (designed primarily for wireless setups) can be configured with multiple downloaded or custom layouts, as well as add function layers or custom combinations. The Kinesis Advantage allows for reprogramming single keys (not key combinations), as well as creating macros for remapping combinations of keys. However, this includes more processing from the keyboard hardware, and can therefore be slightly slower, with a lag that may be noticed in daily use. It can also be modified to run QMK.

Certain virtual keyboards and keyboard layouts are accessible online. Without hardware limitations, these online keyboards can display custom layouts or allow users to pre-configure or try out different language layouts. The resulting text can then be pasted into other websites or applications, flexibly with no need to reprogram keyboard mappings at all.

Non-QWERTY layouts were also used with specialized machines, such as the 90-key Linotype typesetting machine. Additionally, several specialist commercial keyboards have created their own layouts, such as Malt, created by Maltron. It was designed for their molded, ergonomic keyboards, and adapted for flat keyboards, with a compromise: a flat keyboard has a single, wide spacebar, rather than a space button as on Maltron keyboards, so the E key was moved to the bottom row. Additionally, the layout PLUM was designed for the ortholinear keyboard of the same name.

== Non-Latin phonetic scripts ==
Some keyboard layouts for non-Latin phonetic scripts, most notably the Greek layout, are based on the QWERTY layout. In these layouts, glyphs are assigned to keys that correspond as closely as possible to similar-sounding or appearing glyphs in QWERTY. This approach saves learning time for those familiar with QWERTY, and eases entry of Latin characters (with QWERTY) as well for Greek users.

However, this is not a universal practice; many non-Latin keyboard layouts have been designed from scratch.

All non-Latin computer keyboard layouts can also support input of Latin letters as well as the script of the language, which is useful for tasks such as typing URLs or names. This can be done through a dedicated key on the keyboard devoted to this task, or through some special combination of keys, or software that does not require extensive keyboard interaction.

=== Abugidas ===
==== Brahmic scripts ====
- Media related to Brahmic keyboard layouts at Wikimedia Commons

===== Baybayin =====
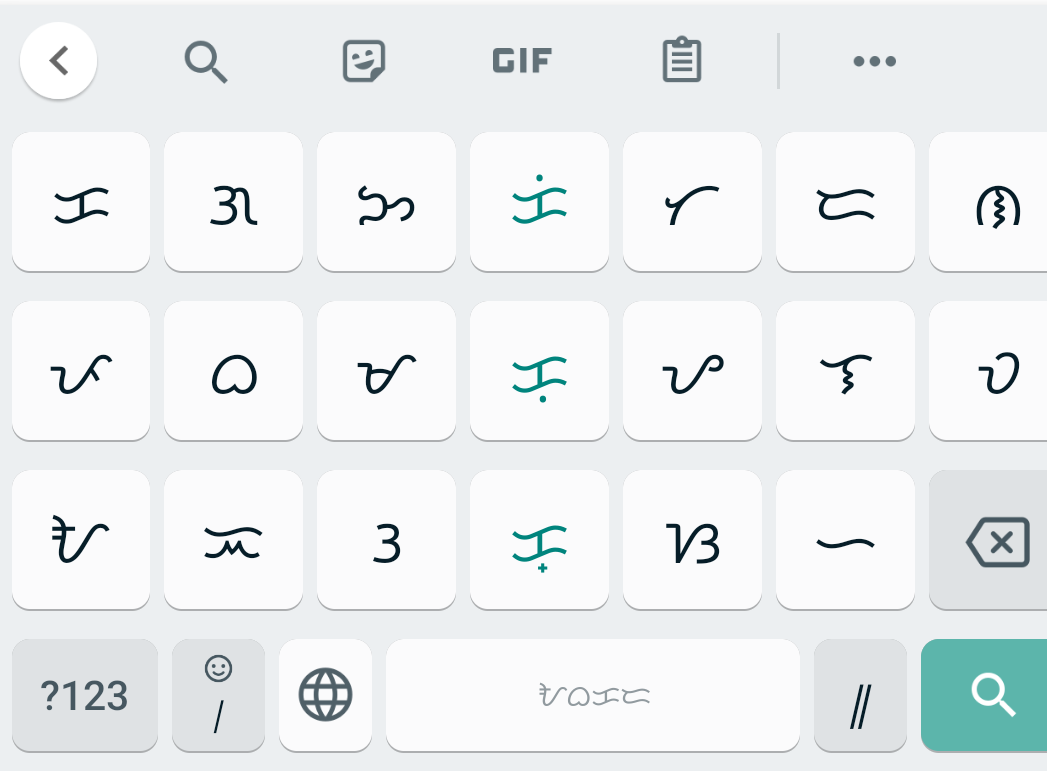
A screenshot image of the baybayin keyboard on Gboard

It is possible to type baybayin directly from one's keyboard without the need to use web applications that implement an input method. The Philippines Unicode Keyboard Layout includes different sets of baybayin layout for different keyboard users: QWERTY, Capewell-Dvorak, Capewell-QWERF 2006, Colemak, and Dvorak, all of which work in both Microsoft Windows and Linux.

===== Bengali =====
Bangla National (Jatiyo) Keyboard by Bangladesh Computer Council

There are many different systems developed to type Bengali language characters using typewriters or a computer keyboard and mobile device. There were efforts taken to standardize the input system for Bengali in Bangladesh (জাতীয় Jatiyo layout), but still no input method has yet been effectively adopted widely.

===== Dhivehi =====
Dhivehi Keyboards have two layouts. Both are supported by Microsoft Windows (Windows XP and later).

===== InScript =====
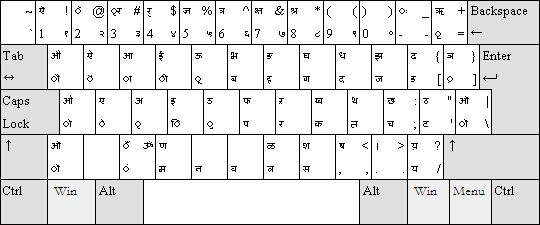
InScript keyboard layout for Sanskrit

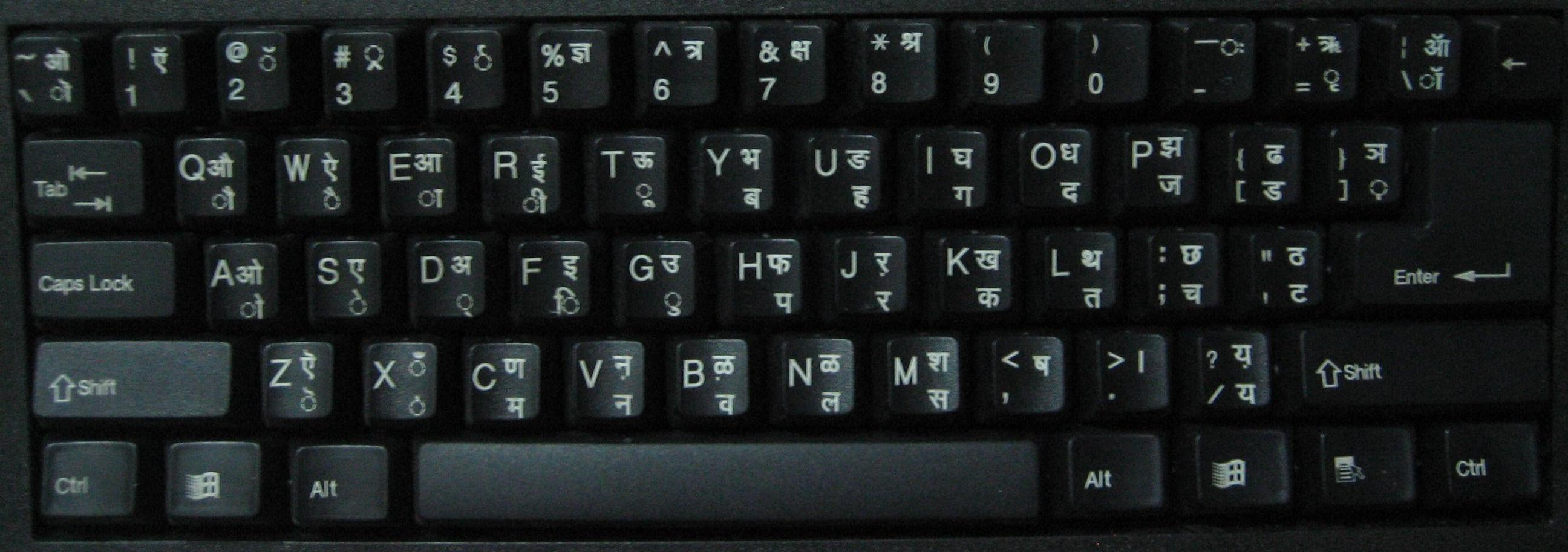
A Devanagari InScript bilingual keyboard

InScript is the standard keyboard for 12 Indian scripts including Assamese, Bengali, Devanagari, Gujarati, Gurmukhi, Kannada, Malayalam, Oriya, Tamil, and Telugu, etc.

Most Indian scripts are derived from Brahmi, therefore their alphabetic order is identical. Based on this property, the InScript keyboard layout scheme was prepared. So a person who knows InScript typing in one language can type in other scripts using dictation even without knowledge of that script.

An InScript keyboard is built into in most modern operating systems including Windows, Linux, and macOS. It is also available in some mobile phones.

===== Javanese =====
Javanese keyboard available for Linux (like Ubuntu Distro) also on Windows. The Javanese keyboard, when run on a PC or laptop, can use a physical QWERTY keyboard.

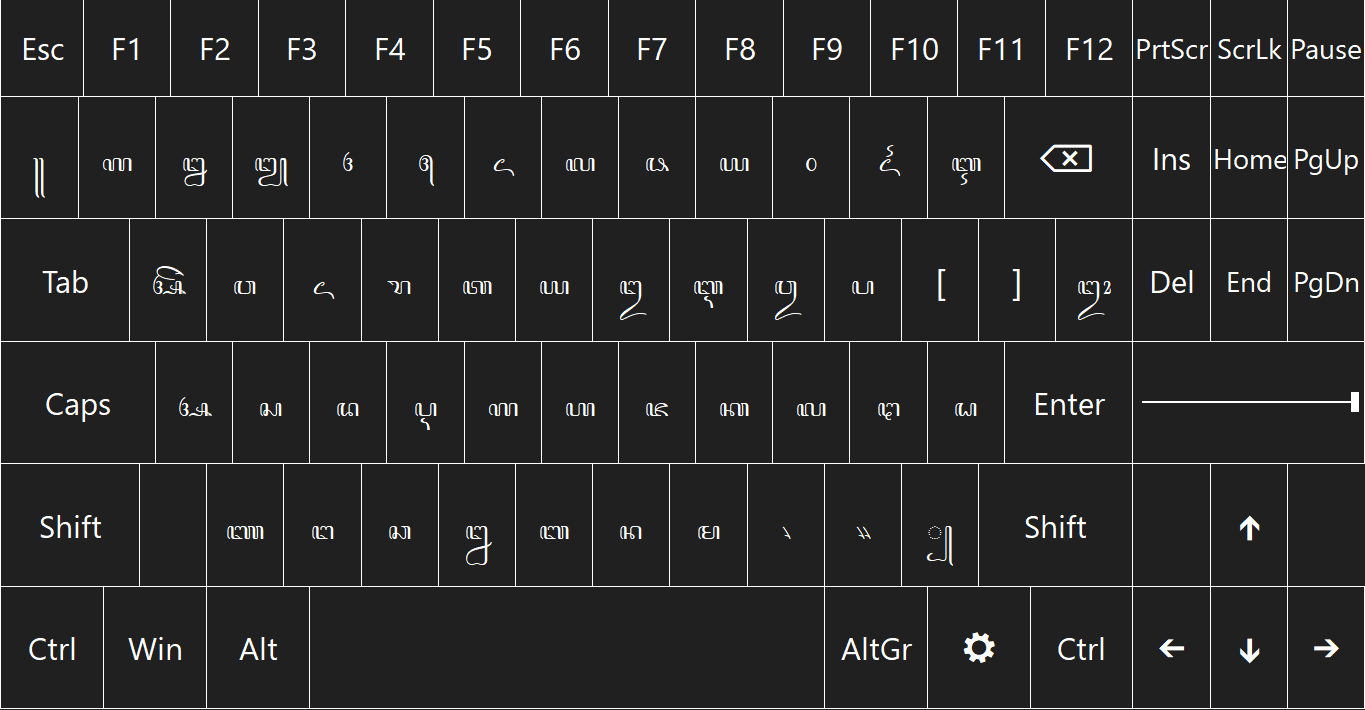
Javanese keyboard layout for Javanese script. Keyboard using font Tuladha Jejeg

===== Khmer =====
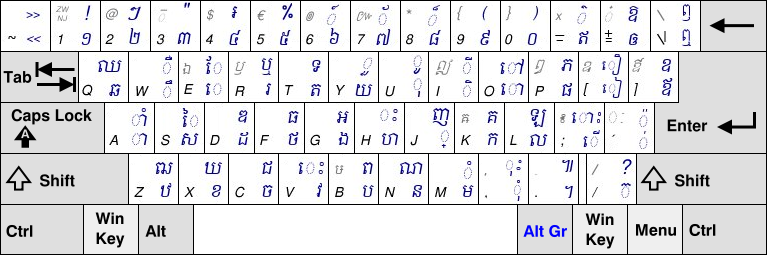
Khmer keyboard layout

Khmer uses its own layout designed to correspond, to the extent practicable, to its QWERTY counterpart, thus easing the learning curve in either direction. For example, the letter ល [lɔː] is typed on the same key as the letter L on the English-based QWERTY. It also has many specifics due to its record number of vowels, consonants and punctuation signs as well as its cluster structure which bundles letters together in one.

===== Thai =====
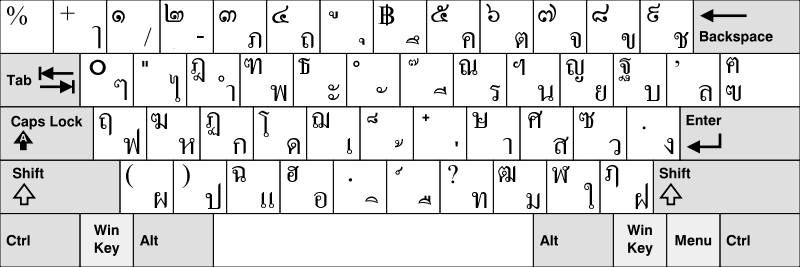
Thai Kedmanee keyboard layout

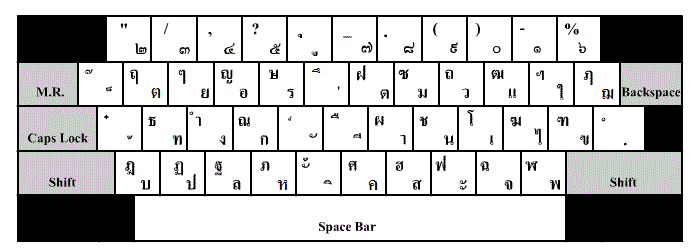
Thai Pattachote keyboard layout

The Thai Kedmanee keyboard layout is the predominant layout used for typing Thai. The Thai Pattachote keyboard layout is also available, but is much less common. Infrequently used characters are accessed via the Shift key. Despite their wide usage in Thai, Arabic numerals are not present on the main section of the keyboard. Instead they are accessed via the numeric keypad or by switching to the Latin character set on keyboards without dedicated numeric keys.

===== Lao =====
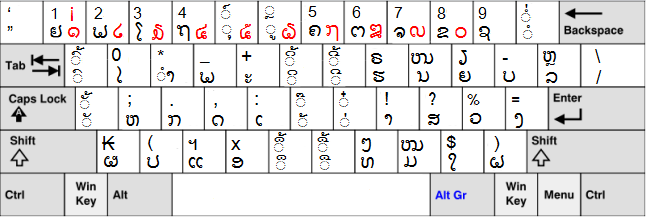
Lao keyboard layout

The keyboard layout for Lao language is specifically designed to accommodate Lao script.

===== Sinhala =====
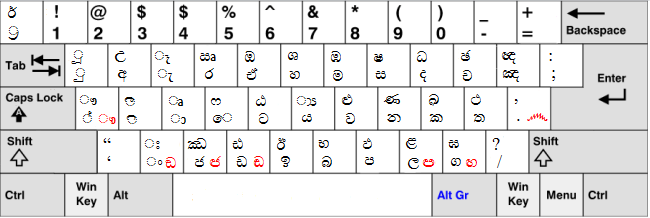
Windows Sinhala layout

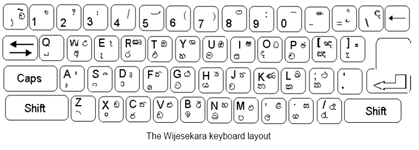
Wijesekara layout

The Sinhala keyboard layout is based on the Wijesekara typewriter for Sinhala script. For Windows, the Sinhala layout is available, along with the Wijesekara layout.

===== Tibetan =====
====== Tibetan (China) ======
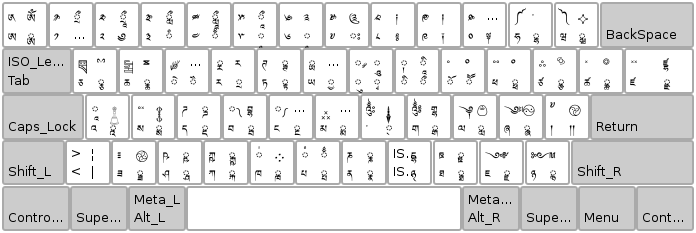
Tibetan keyboard layout

The Chinese National Standard on Tibetan Keyboard Layout standardizes a layout for the Tibetan language in China.

The first version of Microsoft Windows to support the Tibetan keyboard layout is MS Windows Vista. The layout has been available in Linux since September 2007.

====== Tibetan (International) ======
Mac OS X introduced Tibetan Unicode support with OS X version 10.5 and later, now with three different keyboard layouts available: Tibetan-Wylie, Tibetan QWERTY and Tibetan-Otani.

====== Dzongkha (Bhutan) ======
Dzongkha keyboard layout

The Bhutanese Standard for a Dzongkha keyboard layout standardizes the layout for typing Dzongkha and other languages using the Tibetan script in Bhutan. This layout was developed by the Dzongkha Development Commission and Department of Information Technology in Bhutan. The Dzongkha keyboard layout is very easy to learn as the key sequence essentially follows the order of letters in the Dzongkha and Tibetan alphabet. The layout has been available in Linux since 2004.

==== Inuktitut ====
Latin keyboard layout for Inuktitut

Naqittaut keyboard layout for Inuktitut

Inuktitut has two similar, though not identical, commonly available keyboard layouts for Windows. Both contain a basic Latin layout in its base and shift states, with a few Latin characters in the AltGr shift states. The Canadian Aboriginal syllabics can be found in the CapsLock and AltGr shift states in both layouts as well.

The difference between the two layouts lies in the use of ] as an alternate to AltGr to create the dotted, long vowel syllables, and the mapping of the small plain consonants to the Caps + number keys in the "Naqittaut" layout, while the "Latin" layout does not have access to the plain consonants, and can only access the long vowel syllables through the AltGr shift states.

=== Abjads ===
==== Arabic ====
Arabic Windows keyboard layout

This layout was developed by Microsoft from the classic Arabic typewriter layout and is used by IBM PCs. There is also a 102-key variant and a 102-key phonetic variant that maps to AZERTY.

Arabic Mac keyboard layout

For Apple keyboards, a different Arabic layout is used.

Additionally, a 1:1 layout is available for Chrome.

==== Hebrew ====
Hebrew keyboard

All keyboards in Israel are fitted with both Latin and Hebrew letters. Some trilingual editions also include Arabic or Cyrillic.

In the standard layout (but not on all keyboards), paired delimiters—parentheses (), brackets [], and braces {}, as well as less/greater than <>—are in the opposite order from the standard in other left-to-right languages. This results in "open"/"close" being consistent with right-to-left languages (Shift-9 always gives "close parenthesis" U+0029, which visually looks like "open parenthesis" in left-to-right languages). This is shared with Arabic keyboards.

Certain Hebrew layouts are extended to include niqqud symbols (vowel points), which require Alt+Shift or similar key combination to type.

==== Tifinagh ====
Moroccan (IRCAM) Tamazight (Berber) keyboard layout for Tifinagh script

The Royal institute of the Amazigh culture (IRCAM) developed a national standard Tifinagh keyboard layout for Tamazight people in Morocco. This layout is included in Linux and Windows 8, and is available for Mac and older versions of Windows.

A compatible, international version, called "Tifinagh (International)", supports a wide range of Tamazight (Berber) language variants, including Tuareg variants. It was designed by the Universal Amazigh Keyboard Project and is available on its SourceForge page.

==== Urdu ====
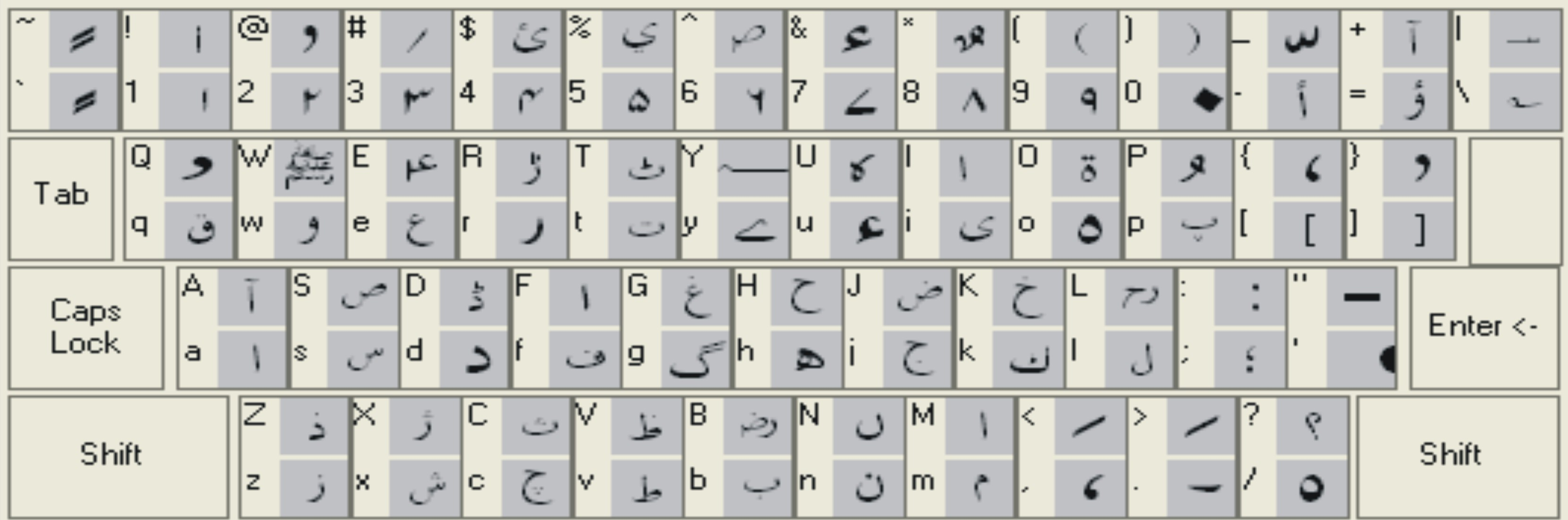
The standard layout

Urdu has a standardized layout present, developed by the National Language Authority. More commonly, however, the phonetic keyboard is used on smartphones and desktops, aligning the Urdu letters with their Latin counterparts (for example, pressing Q types ق).

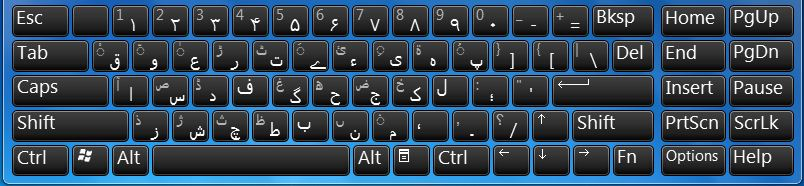
The phonetic keyboard layout on Windows 7

Another version of the keyboard, developed by designer and engineer Zeerak Ahmed, has seen increasing use among younger generations.

=== Alphabetic ===
==== Armenian ====
The Armenian language keyboard is similar to the Greek in that, in most (but not all) cases, a given Armenian letter is positioned at the same location as the corresponding Latin letter on the QWERTY keyboard. The illustrated keyboard layout can be enabled on Linux with: setxkbmap am -variant phonetic. Note that Western and Eastern Armenian have different layouts.

In the pre-computer era, Armenian keyboards featured a different layout designed to facilitate the production of letter combinations specific to the Armenian language.

Several attempts have been made to create innovative ergonomic layouts, some of which are inspired by Dvorak.

Armenian keyboard layouts
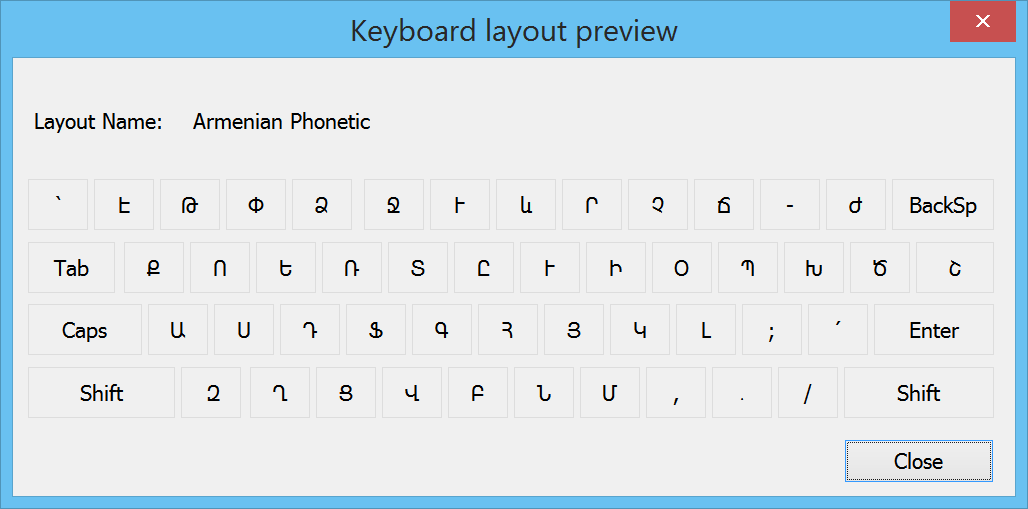
Armenian computer keyboard layout

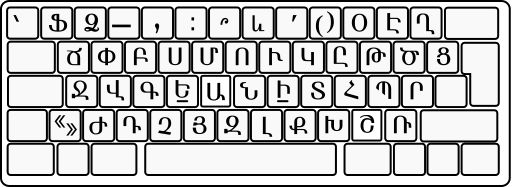
Armenian typewriter keyboard layout

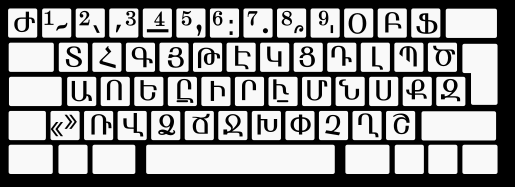
Armenian keyboard layout inspired by Dvorak

==== Cyrillic ====
===== Bulgarian =====
Bulgarian keyboard layout (BDS 5237:1978)

The current official Bulgarian keyboard layout for both typewriters and computer keyboards is described in BDS (Bulgarian State/National Standard) 5237:1978. It superseded the old standard, BDS 5237:1968, on 1 January 1978. Like the Dvorak layout, it has been designed to optimize typing speed and efficiency, placing the most common letters in the Bulgarian language—О, Н, Т, and А—under the strongest fingers. In addition to the standard 30 letters of the Bulgarian alphabet, the layout includes the non-Bulgarian Cyrillic symbols Э and ы and the Roman numerals I and V (the X is supposed to be represented by the Cyrillic capital Х, which is acceptable in typewriters but problematic in computers).

There is also a second, informal layout in widespread use—the so-called "phonetic" layout, in which Cyrillic letters are mapped to the QWERTY keys for Latin letters that "sound" or "look" the same, with several exceptions (Я is mapped to Q, Ж is mapped to V, etc.—see the layout and compare it to the standard QWERTY layout). This layout is available as an alternative to the BDS one in some operating systems, including Microsoft Windows, Apple macOS, and Ubuntu Linux. Normally, the layouts are set up so that the user can switch between Latin and Cyrillic script by pressing Shift + Alt, and between BDS and Phonetic by pressing Shift + Ctrl.

In 2006, Prof. Dimiter Skordev from the Faculty of Mathematics and Informatics of Sofia University and Dimitar Dobrev from the Bulgarian Academy of Sciences proposed a new standard, prBDS 5237:2006, including a revised version of the BDS layout, which includes the letter Ѝ and the capital Ы and replaces the letters I and V with the currency symbols of $ and € respectively, and a standardization of the informal "phonetic" layout. After some controversy and a public discussion in 2008, the proposal was not accepted, although it had been already used in several places—the "Bulgarian Phonetic" layout in MS Windows Vista is based on it. There is a new "Bulgarian Phonetic" layout in MS Windows 7.

===== Macedonian =====
Macedonian keyboard layout

The Macedonian keyboard layout is phonetic. The Latin letters that have a phonetic equivalent in Macedonian are used for the corresponding Cyrillic letters. The letters in the Macedonian alphabet and characters used in the Macedonian orthography that do not have any phonetic equivalent are Љ, Њ, Ѕ, Ш, Ѓ, Ж, Ч, Ќ, Ѝ, Ѐ.

Even though they are not part of the Macedonian alphabet and are not used in the Macedonian language, the first Macedonian keyboard layout supported by Windows uses Alt Gr to type the glyphs Ћ and Ђ, where their capital forms are next to the lowercase forms. This keyboard does not include the glyphs Ѝ and Ѐ.

A new revised standard version of the layout was supported with Windows Vista. This version includes the glyphs Ѝ and Ѐ and uses Alt Gr to add an acute accent, which was not included in the original Macedonian layout.

===== Mongolian =====
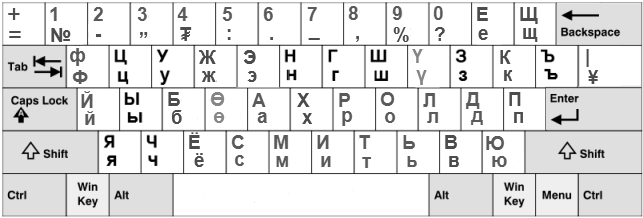
Mongolian Windows keyboard layout

The Mongolian standard keyboard layout uses Cyrillic.

===== Russian =====
====== JCUKEN ======
Russian Windows keyboard layout

The most common keyboard layout in modern Russia is the so-called Windows layout, which is the default Russian layout used in the MS Windows operating system. This layout was designed to be compatible with the hardware standard in many other countries, but introduced compromises to accommodate the larger Russian alphabet. For instance, the full stop and comma symbols share a key, requiring the shift key to be held to produce a comma, despite the high relative frequency of commas in the language.

There are also other Russian keyboard layouts in use, such as the traditional Russian Typewriter layout (where punctuation symbols are placed on numerical keys, and the shift key is required to enter numbers) and the Russian DOS layout (similar to the Russian Typewriter layout, with common punctuation symbols on numerical keys, but numbers are entered without using the shift key). The Russian Typewriter layout can be found on many Russian typewriters produced before the 1990s and is the default Russian keyboard layout in the OpenSolaris operating system.

Keyboards in Russia always feature Cyrillic letters on the keytops alongside Latin letters, usually distinguished by different colors.

====== Russian QWERTY/QWERTZ-based phonetic layouts ======
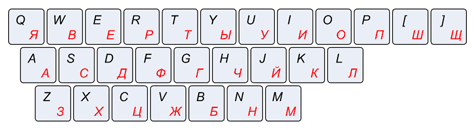
Russian phonetic keyboard layout

The Russian phonetic keyboard layout (also called homophonic or transliterated) is widely used outside Russia, where normally there are no Russian letters drawn on the keys. This layout is made for typists who are more familiar with other layouts, like the common English QWERTY keyboard, and follows the Greek and Armenian layouts in placing most letters at the corresponding Latin letter locations. It is popular among both native speakers and people who use, teach, or are learning Russian, and is recommended—along with the Standard Layout—by the linguists, translators, teachers and students of AATSEEL.org.

The earliest known implementation of the Cyrillic-to-QWERTY homophonic keyboard was by former AATSEEL officer Constance Curtin between 1972 and 1976, for the PLATO education system's Russian Language curriculum developed at the University of Illinois at Urbana-Champaign. Curtin's design sought to map phonetically related Russian sounds to QWERTY keys, to map proximate phonetic and visual cues nearby each other, and assign unused positions mnemonically. Peter Zelchenko who worked under Curtin at UIUC, later modified the number row for Windows and Macintosh keyboards, following Curtin's original design intent.

There are several different Russian phonetic layouts, such as YaZhERT (яжерт), YaWERT (яверт), and YaShERT (яшерт), the latter suggested by AATSEEL.org and known as the "Student" layout. They are named after the first few letters that take over the 'QWERTY' row on the Latin keyboard. They differ in the placement of certain letters. For example, some layouts have Cyrillic 'B' (pronounced 'V') on the Latin 'W' key (after the German transliteration of B), while others place it on the Latin 'V' key.

There are also variations within these variations; for example the Mac OS X Phonetic Russian layout is YaShERT but differs in placement of the letters ж and э.

Windows 10 includes its own implementation of a mnemonic QWERTY-based input method for Russian, which does not fully rely on assigning a key to every Russian letter. Instead, it uses combinations like sh, sc, ch, ya (ja), yu (ju), ye (je) and yo (jo) to input ш, щ, ч, я, ю, э, and ё, respectively.

Virtual (on-screen) keyboards allow users to enter Cyrillic directly in a browser without activating the system layout.

===== Serbian (Cyrillic) =====
Serbian Cyrillic keyboard layout

Apart from a set of characters common to most Cyrillic alphabets, the Serbian Cyrillic layout uses six additional special characters unique or nearly unique to the Serbian Cyrillic alphabet: Љ, Њ, Ћ, Ђ, Џ, and Ј. The Macedonian Ѕ is also present on this keyboard, despite not being used in Serbian Cyrillic.

Due to the bialphabetic nature of the language, actual physical keyboards with the Serbian Cyrillic layout printed on the keys are uncommon today. Keyboards sold in Serbian-speaking markets typically feature Serbian Latin characters and are used with both the Latin (QWERTZ) and Cyrillic layout configured in the software. The two layouts are easily interchangeable because the non-alphabetic keys are identical, and the alphabetic keys correspond directly to their counterparts. The exceptions are the Latin letters Q, W, X, and Y, which have no Cyrillic equivalents, and the Cyrillic letters Љ, Њ and Џ, whose Latin counterparts are digraphs LJ, NJ and DŽ. This alignment makes the Serbian Cyrillic layout a rare example of a non-Latin layout based on QWERTZ.

===== Ukrainian =====
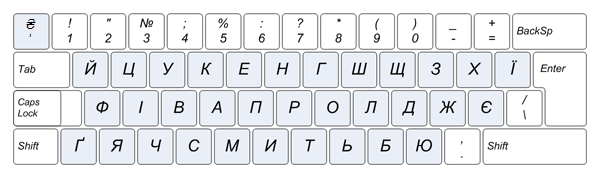
Ukrainian keyboard layout

Ukrainian keyboards, based on a slight modification of the Russian Standard Layout, often also have the Russian Standard ("Windows") layout marked on them, making it easy to switch from one language to another. This keyboard layout had several problems, one of which was the omission of the letter Ґ (now settled with the combination of right-alt+Г), which does not exist in Russian. The other long-standing problem was the omission of the apostrophe, which is used in Ukrainian almost as commonly as in English (though with a different meaning), but which also does not exist in Russian. Both of these problems were resolved with the "improved Ukrainian" keyboard layout for Windows available with Vista and subsequent Windows versions.

There is also an adapted keyboard for Westerners learning Ukrainian (mostly in the diaspora) that closely matches the QWERTY keyboard, so that the letters either have the same sound or same shape, for example pressing the "v" on the Latin QWERTY produces the Cyrillic в (which makes roughly the same sound) and pressing the QWERTY "w" key gives the Cyrillic ш (based on the similar shape). This layout is usually called a homophonic or phonetic layout.

==== Georgian ====
Georgian keyboard

There are no keyboards in Georgia with the Georgian script printed on the hardware. The conventional keyboards are American QWERTY with a phonetically matched Georgian software layout. Hardware with both the Latin QWERTY and the Russian layout is very common, forcing Georgians to know the Georgian layout blindly. As with Armenian, Greek, and phonetic Russian layouts, most Georgian letters are on the same keys as their Latin equivalents. During the Soviet era, the Georgian alphabet was adapted to the Russian JCUKEN layout, mainly for typewriters. Soviet computers did not support Georgian keyboards. After the dissolution of the Soviet Union, a large variety of computers were introduced to post-Soviet countries. The keyboards had a QWERTY layout for the Latin alphabet and JCUKEN for Cyrillic both printed on the keys. Georgia started to adopt the QWERTY pattern. In both cases, the letters that did not exist in the Cyrillic or Latin alphabets were substituted by letters that did not exist in the Georgian alphabet. Today, the most commonly used layout follows the QWERTY pattern with some changes.

==== Greek ====
Greek keyboard layout in comparison to US layout

The usual Greek layout follows the US layout for letters related to Latin letters (ABDEHIKLMNOPRSTXYZ, ΑΒΔΕΗΙΚΛΜΝΟΠΡΣΤΧΥΖ, respectively), substitutes phonetically similar letters (Φ at F; Γ at G), and uses the remaining slots for the remaining Greek letters: (Ξ at J; Ψ at C; Ω at V; and Θ at U).

Greek has two fewer letters than English, but it has two diacritic marks which, because of their frequency, are placed on the home row at the QWERTY ";" position; they are dead keys. Word-final sigma has its own position as well, replacing W, and the semicolon (which is used as a question mark in Greek) and colon move to the position of Q.

The Greek Polytonic layout has various dead keys to input the accented letters. In Microsoft Windows, there are also the Greek 220 layout and the Greek 319 layout.

=== Syllabic ===
==== Cherokee ====
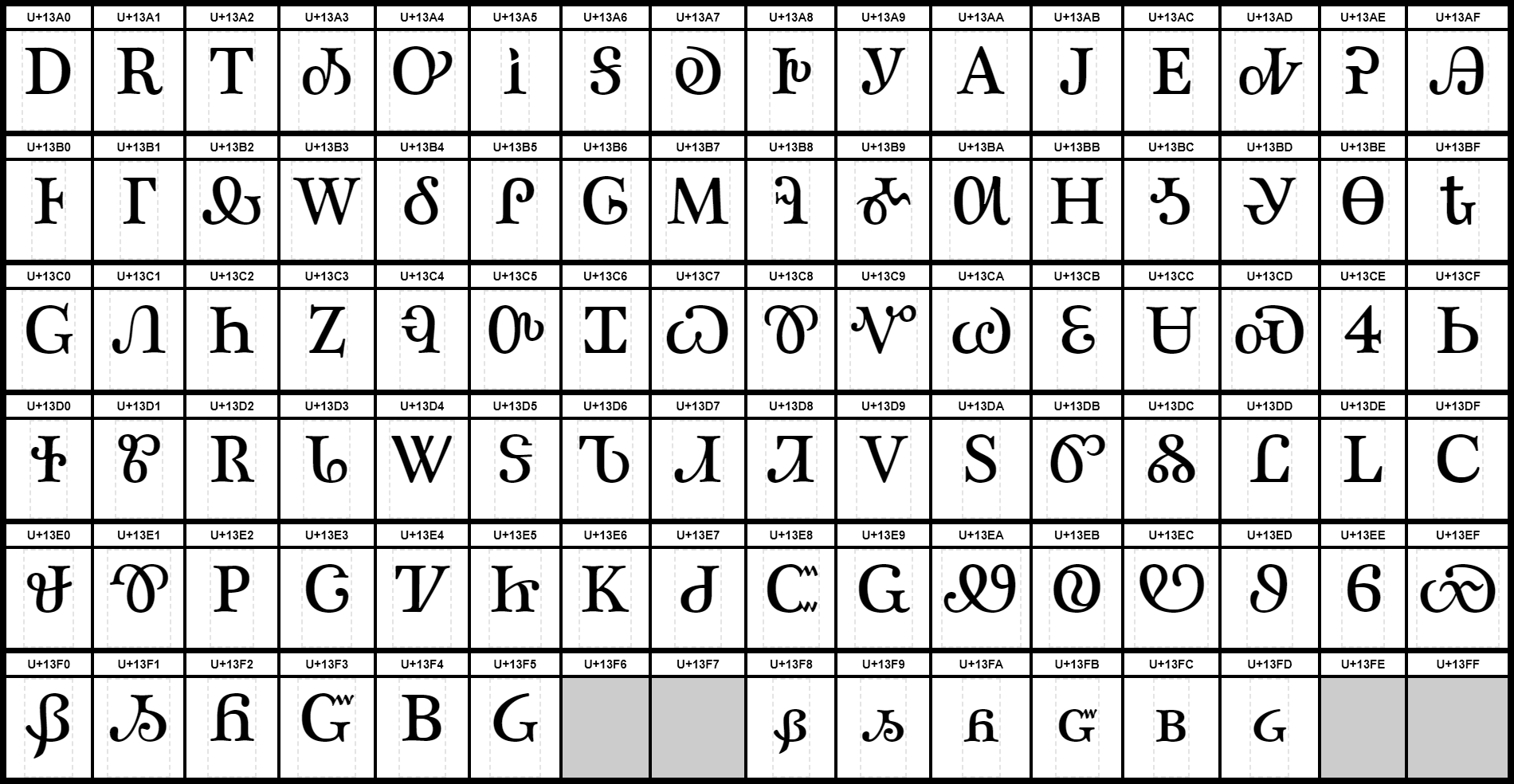
Cherokee Unicode block

The Cherokee language uses an 86-character syllabary. A keyboard for this language is available for the iPhone and iPad and is supported by Google.

== East Asian languages ==
The orthography used for Chinese, Japanese, and Korean ("CJK characters") requires special input methods, due to the thousands of possible characters in these languages. Various methods have been invented to fit every possibility into a QWERTY keyboard, so CJKV keyboards are essentially the same as those in other countries. However, their input methods are considerably more complex, without one-to-one mappings between keys and characters.

In general, the range of possibilities is first narrowed down (often by entering the desired character's pronunciation). Then, if there remains more than one possibility, the desired ideogram is selected, either by typing the number before the character, or using a graphical menu to select it. The computer assists the typist by using heuristics to guess which character is most likely desired. Although this may seem painstaking, CJKV input methods are today sufficient in that, even for beginners, typing in these languages is only slightly slower than typing an alphabetic language like English, where each phoneme is represented by one grapheme.

In Japanese, the QWERTY-based JIS keyboard layout is used, and the pronunciation of each character is entered using various approximations to Hepburn romanization or Kunrei-shiki romanization. There are several kana-based typing methods.

Of the three, Chinese has the most varied input options. Characters can either be entered by pronunciation (like Japanese and Hanja in Korean), or by structure. Most of the structural methods are very difficult to learn but extremely efficient for experienced typists, as there is no need to select characters from a menu.

There exist a variety of other, slower methods in which a character may be entered. If the pronunciation of a character is not known, the selection can be narrowed down by giving its component shapes, radicals, and stroke count. Also, many input systems include a "drawing pad" permitting "handwriting" of a character using a mouse. Finally, if the computer does not have CJK software installed, it may be possible to enter a character directly through its encoding number (e.g., Unicode).

In contrast to Chinese and Japanese, Korean is typed similarly to Western languages. There exist two major forms of keyboard layouts: Dubeolsik (두벌식), and Sebeolsik (세벌식). Dubeolsik, which shares its symbol layout with the QWERTY keyboard, is much more commonly used. While Korean consonants and vowels (jamo) are grouped together into syllabic grids when written, the script is essentially alphabetical, and therefore typing in Korean is quite simple for those who understand the Korean alphabet, Hangul. Each jamo is assigned to a single key. As the user types letters, the computer automatically groups them into syllabic characters. Given a sequence of jamo, there is only one unambiguous way letters can be validly grouped into syllables, so the computer groups them together as the user types.

=== Chinese ===
Chinese keyboards are usually in US layout with/without Chinese input method labels printed on keys. Without an input method handler activated, these keyboards would simply respond to Latin characters as physically labelled, provided that the US keyboard layout is selected correctly in the operating system. Most modern input methods allow input of both simplified and traditional characters, and will simply default to one or the other based on the locale setting.

==== Mainland China ====
Keyboards used in mainland China are standard or slightly modified US (QWERTY) ones without extra labelling, while various input method editors (IMEs) are employed to input Chinese characters. The most common IMEs are pinyin-based, representing the Standard Chinese pronunciation of characters using Latin letters. However, keyboards with labels for alternative structural input methods such as the Wubi method can also be found, although those are usually very old products and are extremely rare, as of 2015.

==== Taiwan ====
Chinese (Taiwan) keyboard layout, a US keyboard with Zhuyin, Cangjie, and Dayi key labels

Computers in Taiwan often use US keyboards with bopomofo (zhuyin) labels, many also with Cangjie method key labels, as Cangjie is a popular method for typing in traditional Chinese characters. The bopomofo style keyboards are in lexicographic order, from top to bottom and left to right. The codes of three input methods are typically printed on the Chinese (traditional) keyboard: Zhuyin (upper right); Cangjie (lower left); and Dayi (lower right).

==== Hong Kong and Macau ====
In Hong Kong, both Chinese (Taiwan) and US keyboards are found. Japanese keyboards are occasionally found, and UK keyboards are rare.

For Chinese input, Shape-based input methods such as Cangjie (pronounced cong1 kit3 in Cantonese) or Chinese handwriting recognition are the most common input methods. The use of phonetic-based input method is uncommon due to the lack of an official standard for Cantonese romanisation and people in Hong Kong rarely learn any romanisation schemes in schools. An advantage of the phonetic-based input method is that most Cantonese speakers can input Traditional Chinese characters with no particular training at all where they spell out the Cantonese sound of each character without tone marks, e.g. 'heung gong' for 香港 (Cantonese Yale: hēung góng; Hong Kong) and choose the characters from a list. However, Microsoft Windows, which is the most popular operating system used in desktops, does not provide any Cantonese phonetic input method, requiring users to find and install third-party input method software. Also, most people find the process of picking characters from a list too slow due to homonyms so the Cangjie method is generally preferred.

Although thorough training and practice are required to use Cangjie, many Cantonese speakers have taken Sucheng input method because of the fast typing speed afforded by the input method. This method is the fastest because it has the capability to fetch the exact, unambiguous Chinese character which the user has in mind to input, pinpointing to only one character in most cases. This is also the reason why no provision for an input of phonetic accent is needed to complement this Input Method. The Cangjie character feature is available on both macOS and Windows. On macOS, the handwriting recognition input method is bundled with the OS.

Macau utilizes the same layouts as Hong Kong, with the addition of Portuguese (Portugal) or English (US) layout for the Portuguese language.

==== Malaysia and Singapore ====
In Malaysia and Singapore, English (US) or Traditional Chinese (Taiwan) layout keyboards are found to input the Chinese language. Some people use Pinyin to enter Traditional Chinese Characters which are the same as the Taiwanese Layout.

=== Japanese ===
Japanese (OADG 109A) keyboard layout with Hiragana keys

Japanese Apple keyboard layout with Hiragana keys

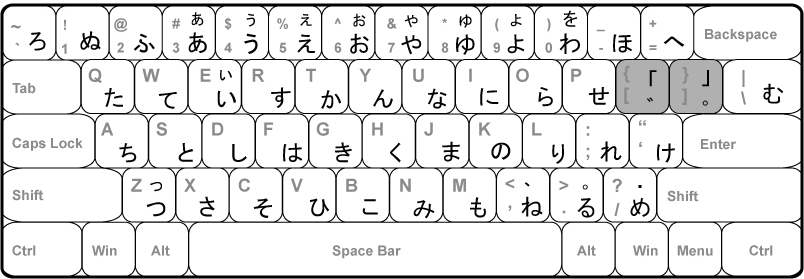
English (US) keyboard with Japanese key labels

The JIS standard layout includes Japanese kana in addition to a QWERTY-style layout. The shifted values of many keys (digits, together with :* ; + - =) are a legacy of bit-paired keyboards, dating back to ASCII telex machines and terminals of the 1960s and 1970s.

For entering Japanese, the most common method is entering text phonetically, as romanized (transliterated) kana, which are then converted to kanji as appropriate by an input method editor. It is also possible to type kana directly, depending on the mode used. To type たかはし, "Takahashi", a Japanese name, one could type either TAKAHAS(H)I (Note: H is optional, see Kunrei-shiki romanization) in Romanized (Rōmaji) input mode, or QTFD in kana input mode. Then, the user can proceed to the conversion step to convert the input into the appropriate kanji.

The extra keys in the bottom row (muhenkan, henkan, and the Hiragana/Katakana switch key), and the special keys in the leftmost column (the hankaku/zenkaku key at the upper left corner, and the eisū key at the Caps Lock position), control various aspects of the conversion process and select different modes of input.

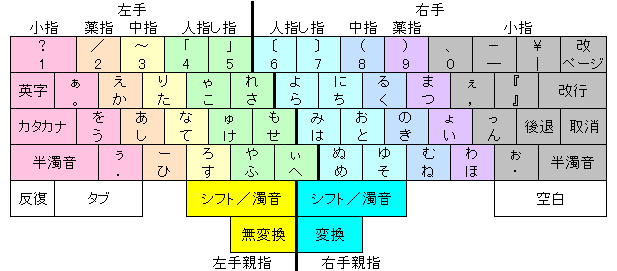
The "Thumb-shift" layout. There are multiple legends and the two modifying keys. "シフト" means L/R Thumb Shift, "後退" means ← Backspace, "取消" means Delete, and "空白" means Space keys.

The Oyayubi Shifuto (Thumb Shift) layout is based on kana input, but uses two modifying keys that replace the space bar. When a key is pressed simultaneously with one of the keys, it yields another letter. Letters with the "dakuten" diacritic are typed with the opposite side "thumb shift". Letters with "handakuten" are either typed while the conventional pinky-operated shift key is pressed (that is, each key corresponds to a maximum of 4 letters), or, on the "NICOLA" variation, on a key which does not have a dakuten counterpart.

The H key in the QWERTY layout, which should be pressed with the R index finger, individually yields は, but with the R Thumb Shift key, it yields み. Simultaneous input with L Thumb Shift yields ば, which is the individually mapped letter with the aforementioned dakuten. While the pinky-operated ⇧ Shift key is pressed, the same key yields ぱ. (This same letter must be typed with L Thumb Shift + Y on the NICOLA variant.)

In Japan, 106-key Japanese keyboards and 101-key English (US layout) keyboards are usually found. For Romanized input users, sometimes a 106-key Japanese keyboard is sold without printed hiragana.

=== Korean ===
Pressing the Han/Eng (한/영) key once switches between Hangul as shown and QWERTY (US layout). There is another key to the left of the space bar for Hanja (한자 or 漢字) input. If using an ordinary keyboard without the two extra keys, typically, the right Alt key becomes the Ha/En key, and the right Ctrl key becomes the Hanja key.

Apple Keyboards do not have the two extra keys, and users can use a key combination (Cmd-Space), the Caps Lock key, or the Globe/Fn key to switch input methods.

The terms Dubeolsik and Sebeolsik are originally descriptions of how many sets of keys the layout has. Earlier typewriters had anywhere from 3 to 5 sets.

==== Dubeolsik ====
Dubeolsik keyboard layout

Based on an earlier teleprinter keyboard layout from 1969, Dubeolsik (두벌식; 2-set) is the national standard Korean keyboard layout since 1983. It is by far the most common layout used in South Korea. Consonants occupy the left side of the layout, while vowels are on the right.

==== Sebeolsik ====
Sebeolsik layouts used today are based on mechanical typewriter layouts invented by Kong Byung Woo in 1949. For most layouts, there are extra keys for ㅗ and ㅜ for typing compound vowels (⟨ㅘ⟩, ⟨ㅙ⟩, ⟨ㅚ⟩, ⟨ㅝ⟩, ⟨ㅞ⟩, ⟨ㅟ⟩). The consonant letters ⟨ㅃ⟩, ⟨ㄸ⟩, ⟨ㄲ⟩, ⟨ㅆ⟩ and ⟨ㅉ⟩ are typed by pressing ㅂ, ㄷ, ㄱ, ㅅ or ㅈ twice. Both of these methods are remnants of the typewriter design.

Sebeolsik 390 keyboard layout

Sebeolsik 390 (세벌식 390; 3-set 390) was released in 1990. It is based on Kong Byung Woo's earlier work. This layout is notable for its compatibility with the QWERTY layout; almost all QWERTY symbols that are not alphanumeric are available in Hangul mode. Numbers are placed in three rows. Syllable-initial consonants are on the right (shown green in the picture), and syllable-final consonants and consonant clusters are on the left (shown red). However, some consonant clusters are not printed on the keyboard; the user has to press multiple consonant keys to input some consonant clusters, unlike Sebeolsik Final.

Sebeolsik Final keyboard layout

Sebeolsik Final (세벌식 최종; 3-set Final) is the final Sebeolsik layout designed by Kong Byung Woo, hence the name. Numbers are placed on two rows. Syllable-initial consonants are on the right, and syllable-final consonants and consonant clusters are on the left. Vowels are in the middle. All consonant clusters are available on the keyboard, unlike the Sebeolsik 390, which does not include all of them. They are more ergonomic than the Dubeolsik, but are not in wide use.

Sebeolsik Noshift keyboard layout

Sebeolsik Noshift is a variant of Sebeolsik which can be used without pressing the shift key. Its advantage is that people with disabilities who cannot press two keys at the same time will be able to use it to type in Hangul.

== See also ==
- IBM PC keyboard
- Half-keyboard
- Telephone keypad letter mapping
