= Phonetic keyboard layout =

Mapping between different language keyboards

A phonetic keyboard layout is a setup in which the letters of a language correspond to the keys in the keyboard layout for another language and assumes a one-to-one correspondence between letters in the languages that is based on their sound.

== Phonetic layouts for Russian ==
Russian has two popular keyboard layouts:

- JCUKEN
- phonetic layout, also known as "ЯВЕРТЫ" or "ЯЖЕРТЫ"

In the latter, the Cyrillic letters are on the same keys as similarly-sounding Roman letters: А-A, Б-B, В-V, Г-G, Д-D, Ф-F, К-K, О-O and so on. There are Russian phonetic layouts based on the QWERTY layout and others based on other localized layouts. The Russian phonetic layout is especially suited for foreigners studying Russian and for many Russian-speakers living outside Russia. Some types of phonetic layouts, such as "Student" and "ЯВЕРТЫ", are not only widely used by Russian-speakers but also recommended by the American Association of Teachers of Slavic and East European Languages.

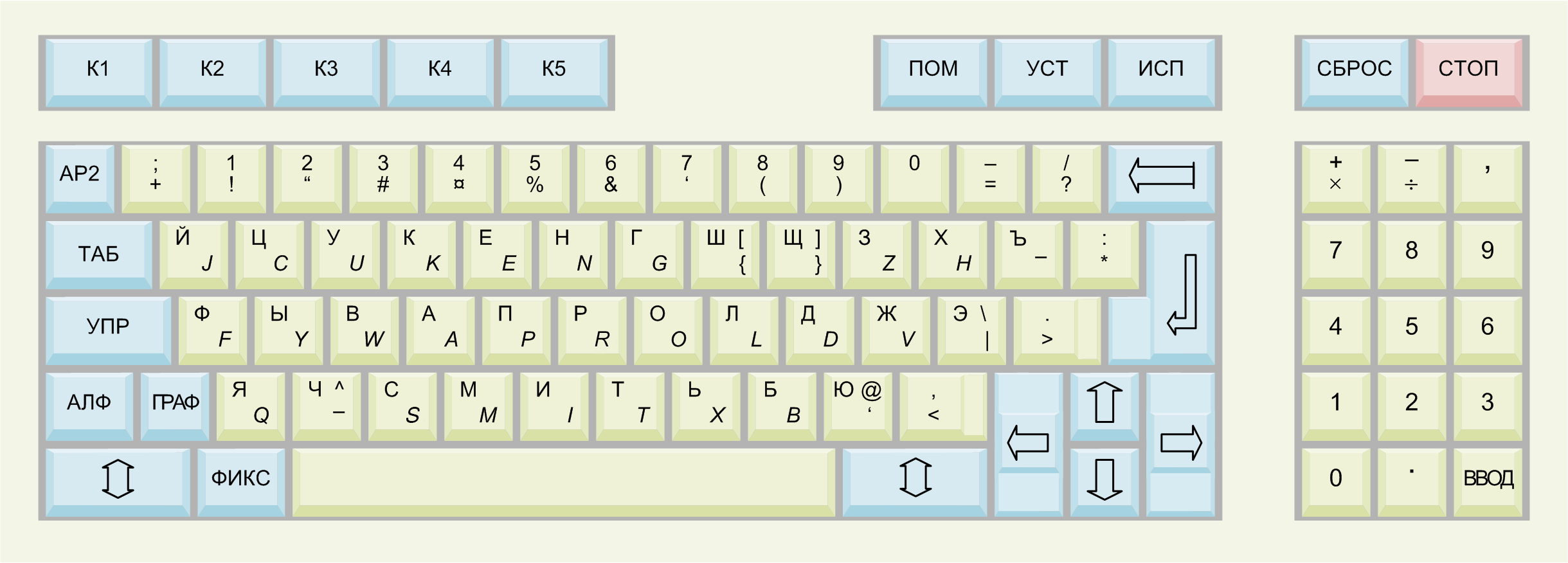
JCUKEN keyboard layout

In some countries, such as Germany, Czech Republic, Sweden and Poland, there are local variants of the phonetic layout keyboard because of the peculiarities of the local keyboard layouts.

Historically, Soviet computers used the phonetic variant of the JCUKEN keyboard layout that were manufactured in the COMECON like the Pravets-8 model, which used the layout for ЯВЕРТЫ/QWERTY. Now, the JCUKEN phonetic layout has been transferred from typewriters to the IBM PC-compatible computers.

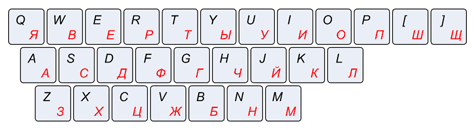
Русская фонетическая раскладка клавиатуры

== Operating system support ==
A number of modern operating systems, such as macOS and Linux, offer the choice of using phonetic keyboard layout for Russian instead of the default layout. To create a phonetic keyboard layout for Microsoft Windows, a special "keyboard layout editor" software, such as MSKLC, available for free from Microsoft, is necessary. A number of ready-made layout files for Microsoft Windows are available online for Russian and Belarusian.

In 2010, Belarusian Latin layouts gained popularity. Using an approach opposite to "ЯВЕРТЫ", they are sometimes called "GCUKHe".
