= PLUM keyboard =

The PLUM Keyboard (US layout)

The PLUM keyboard was a keyboard layout which differed from the traditional QWERTY keyboard in both physical key layout and letter arrangement. Unlike most keyboards, the PLUM keyboard organizes keys in a square grid, as opposed to the staggered rows of a typewriter.

As of 2012, PLUM keyboards are no longer being manufactured.

== Design and rationale ==
The purpose of the product is to teach non-typists how to type, not to encourage Qwerty users to switch. The ergonomic advantages are secondary to the incredibly short learning curve. New typists learning Qwerty can typically expect a 4- to 6-week learning curve, whereas new typists learning Plum can touch-type within two weeks. This is possible because Plum incorporates mnemonics to assist the learner. "READONTHIS" is not only easily remembered, they are the ten most frequently used keys and make up the home row where the fingers rest, thus minimizing finger movement. The Plum layout also gives equal time to each hand. With Qwerty, the left hand does 70% of the work, while the right hand does only 30%.

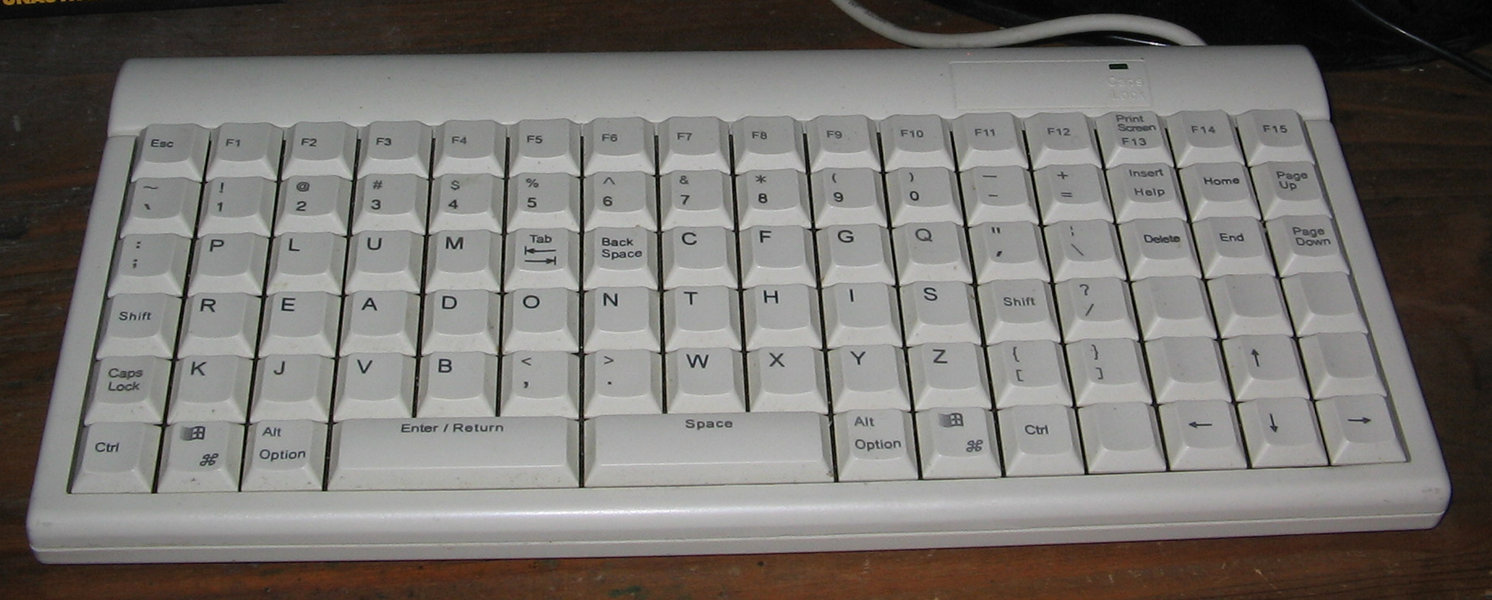
All PLUM keyboards look the same.

The Enter key has moved to a half-length "spacebar" position alongside the spacebar itself. Both keys are now used by one thumb alone; left for Enter and right for Space. Also, the Tab and Backspace keys are centrally located within the array of letters, as are the comma and period.

The layout of the PLUM keyboard is compact, using standard key sizes throughout, rather than the usual widened keytops for control keys. This has led to criticism, particularly over the positioning of the Shift keys. These are at each end of the home row. Although usable for text entry by a touch-typist experienced with the PLUM layout, they are unpopular with programmers who make extensive use of shift for non-letter characters. The extra Function keys F13, F14, and F15 map to Print Screen, Scroll Lock, and the Pause/Break key respectively, although no Scroll Lock light exists. There are also six blank keys surrounding the Arrow keys, which do nothing.

While there are currently no good studies comparing the efficiency of the PLUM and Dvorak keyboards, the Dvorak keyboard is more mainstream, but the PLUM keyboard has a keyboard layout that many find more memorable, with the rows spelling out the words "PLUM," "READONTHIS" and "WXYZ".

== Repetitive strain injury ==
It is debatable whether this layout reduces repetitive strain injury, but the general consensus is that while it might prolong it slightly, the QWERTY keyboard might simply aggravate pains without causing the disease, and studies have shown that typists are not any more likely to develop RSI than normal people. A user of a PLUM keyboard has claimed that using it resulted in less wrist pain than other layouts.
