= Albanian keyboard layout =

Keyboard layouts used to type Albanian language.

== Windows default ==
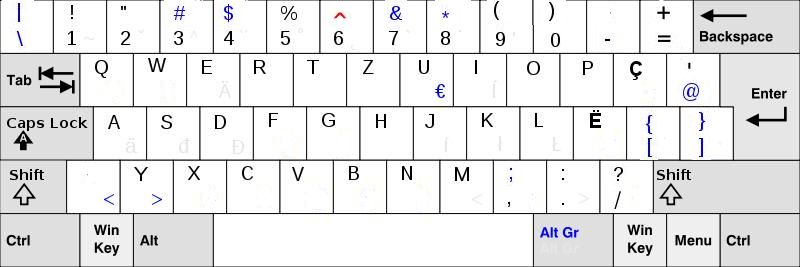
QWERTZ keyboard layout for Albanian.

The Albanian keyboard layout is German based (QWERTZ). The specific Albanian characters are directly accessible (ë, Ë, ç, Ç).

Also can be used the US-International keyboard. You can type the specific Albanian characters in this mode:

- ' + c → ç
- ' + C → Ç
- ⇧ Shift + ' + e → ë
- ⇧ Shift + ' + E → Ë

== Prektora ==
A preferable alternative to the default one is Prektora, a (QWERTY) keyboard layout for Windows 10, 8, 7, Vista, XP and 2000 (in 32 and 64 bit) and Mac OS (ë, Ë, ç, Ç, é, É, ô, Ô, â, Â).

== Plisi ==
While primarily designed for the Albanian language, Plisi may be used to type almost any language using the Latin alphabet.

Plisi is another alternative layout based on the U.S. mechanical keyboard and layout and supplemented with adaptations from the German T2 and QWERTZ Albanian layouts. Plisi is the successor to Plisi D2, one of the several prototypes published on Plisi.al (now Plisi.org).

Plisi is based on the U.S. QWERTY layout including all 26 letters of the Latin alphabet plus Ë and Ç. These two characters and the colon and semicolon are located on the same keys as in the official layout (the default Windows layout). The brackets and braces are relegated to the third level, accessible by AltGr + digits (7 through 0); AltGr + 4, in the meantime, produces the Euro sign.

In addition, Plisi includes an extended set of Level 3 characters and a secondary group. The Level 3 and the secondary group are almost the same as in the German T2 keyboard. However, no dead keys are available in Level 1 and 2; they are all relegated to Level 3. Using Plisi, one may type in almost any language using Unicode Latin characters.

The layout is available for download at Plisi.org, and may be used on desktop devices running on Windows, OS X, and Linux. Most Linux distributions include "Plisi D1", a simple version of Plisi, while Windows and OS X editions have to be installed manually. The various OS editions differ slightly in their implementation of Level 3 characters.

The author of the Plisi layout states he intends to promote it to be adopted as national standards in Albania, Kosovo, and Macedonia, the three countries where Albanian is a national language or official at some level of government.

== JLG Extended Keyboard Layout ==
The JLG Extended Keyboard Layout is a layout working on a US keyboard layout. This layout allows use of all specific Albanian characters.

- ë = CTRL + " then e, or Alt + 0235
- Ë = CTRL + " then E, or Alt + 0203
- ç = CTRL +, then c, or Alt + 0231
- Ç = CTRL +, then C, or Alt + 0199

== Links ==
- Albanian Keyboard Online
- Prektora keyboard layout for Windows and Apple OS
- Plisi keyboard layout for Windows and Apple OS
- Albanian keyboard installation on Windows XP
