= Intelligent Input Bus =

Framework for multilingual input

IBus

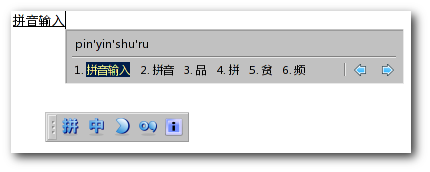
- Intelligent Input Bus (IBus)
- Original author: Peng Huang
- Developer: Peng Huang
- Release: August 2008; 18 years ago
- Stable release: 1.5.34 / 3 April 2026; 4 months ago
- Written in: C, Python
- Operating system: Unix-like
- Available in: Multilingual
- Type: Input method
- License: GNU LGPL v2 or later
- Website: github.com/ibus/ibus
- Repository: github.com/ibus/ibus

The Intelligent Input Bus (IBus, pronounced as I-Bus) is an input method (IM) framework for multilingual input in Unix-like operating-systems. The name "Bus" comes from its bus-like architecture.

== Goals ==
The main goals of the IBus project include:

- Providing full-featured and user-friendly input-method user interfaces
- Employing authentication measures to improve security
- Providing a universal interface and library for input-method developers
- Fitting the need of users from different regions and customs

== Motivation ==
The draft Specification of IM engine Service Provider Interface document from the Northeast Asia OSS Forum Work Group 3 recommends bus-centric IM framework architectures with a bus implementation (similar to dbus). According to the specification, SCIM-1.4 is not considered suitable for further development as it is developed in C++, which usually causes ABI transition problems.

Since then, succeeding projects like IM-BUS (led by James Su) and SCIM-2 (led by Zheng Hu) were started. However, both projects are suspended. Therefore, Huang Peng from Red Hat established the IBus project to prove the idea of IM-BUS by using Python, D-Bus and GLib rather than implementing the functions recommended by CJK OSS forum. In spite of that, IBus has gained community acceptance, and FreeBSD and many Linux distribution such as Fedora and Ubuntu already have IBus in their package repositories. In 2009, IBus became the default input method framework in Fedora 11, and replaced SCIM in Ubuntu 9.10.

== Architecture ==
IBus is developed in C and Python, thus avoiding the C++ ABI transition problem of SCIM <1.4.14.

IBus provides most of its functionality through services. There are three kinds of services:

- Input method engine (IME): Actual input method
- Configuration: Handles the configuration for IBus and other services such as IME
- Panel: User interface such as language bar and candidate selection table

IBus employs D-Bus to communicate among ibus-daemon, services, and IM clients such as terminal emulators, editors and web browsers. ibus-daemon manages all clients and services by receiving registrations from services, and sending D-Bus messages to corresponding services and IM clients.

It implements the XIM protocol, and has GTK and Qt input method modules.

== Features ==
- Engine loading and unloading on demand
- Notification area support on the taskbar
- Interoperability with XKB
- Immediately applies configuration changes
- Provides C and Python bindings

== Available input method plugins and engines ==
- ibus-anthy: A plugin for Anthy, a Japanese IME
- ibus-avro: Phonetic keyboard layout for writing Bengali based on Avro Keyboard
- ibus-cangjie: An engine for the Cangjie input method
- ibus-chewing: An intelligent Chinese Phonetic IME for Zhùyīn users. It is based on libChewing.
- ibus-hangul: A Korean IME
- ibus-libpinyin: A newer Chinese IME for Pinyin users. Designed by Huang Peng and Peng Wu.
- ibus-libthai: A Thai IME based on libthai
- ibus-libzhuyin: An engine for the Zhùyīn ("bopomofo") input method (an alternative to ibus-chewing)
- ibus-m17n: A multilingualization(m17n) IME which allows input of many languages using the input methods from m17n-db. See more details in #ibus-m17n.
- ibus-mozc: A plugin to the Japanese IME "mozc" developed by Google
- ibus-pinyin: An intelligent Chinese Phonetic IME for Hanyu pinyin users. Designed by Huang Peng (main author of IBus) and has many advanced features such as English spell checking. Deprecated and replaced with ibus-libpinyin (see above)
- ibus-table: An IME that accommodates table-based IMs. See more details in #ibus-table.
- ibus-unikey: An IME for typing Vietnamese characters that adheres to the classic to that of Windows version
- ibus-bamboo: An IME for typing Vietnamese characters with improved features such as spellcheck, variety of input modes, advanced tone marking
- ibus-bambusa: A highly optimized Rust port of ibus-bamboo with strong focus on GNOME integration

=== ibus-m17n ===
ibus-m17n is an IME that uses input methods and corresponding icons in the multilingualization database, abbreviated to the numeronym "m17n". Unlike ibus-table which supports plain tables, m17n input methods also support states, whose labels are displayed on the IBus panel (language bar). M17n input methods also support surrounding text, consequently, languages such as Thai and IMs such as plain Zhuyin that require this feature are supported through ibus-m17n, as is pinyin with diacritics for the four tones.

=== ibus-table ===
ibus-table, developed by Yu Wei Yu, is an IME that loads tables of input methods which do not need complicated logic to select words. Many structure-based Chinese input methods such as Cangjie and Wubi are supported this way.

Officially released IM tables:

- latex: Input special characters using LaTeX syntax. Included in ibus-table package.
- compose: input special letter by compose letter and diacritical mark. Included in ibus-table package.
- Array30: Array30 Chinese IM tables
- Cangjie: Cangjie 3 and 5 Chinese IM tables
- Erbi: Er-bi Chinese IM table
- Wubi: Wubi Chinese IM table
- Yong: YongMa Chinese IM Table
- ZhengMa: ZhengMa Chinese IM table

== See also ==
- List of input methods for UNIX platforms
- fcitx
- Input method
- m17n
- SCIM
- uim
