= List of input methods for Unix platforms =

This is intended as a non-exhaustive list of input methods for Unix platforms. An input method is a means of entering characters and glyphs that have a corresponding encoding in a character set. See the input method page for more information.

Name	Languages supported	XIM	Qt4	GTK 2	GTK 3	Other
IBus	Multiple languages, including CJK	Yes	Yes	Yes	Yes	
SCIM	Multiple languages, including CJK	Yes	Yes	Yes	Yes	
Fcitx	Multiple languages, including CJK	Yes	Yes	Yes	Yes	fbterm
uim	Multiple languages, including CJK	Yes	Yes	Yes	Yes	Leim, TTY and TSM (Mac OS X)
GCIN	Chinese input method server for Big5 Traditional Chinese character sets, expandible with input methods e.g. from SCIM.	Yes		Yes	Yes	
xcin	Mainly for traditional Chinese; adapted for use for simplified Chinese.	Yes				
oxim	Mainly for traditional Chinese; adapted for use for simplified Chinese.	Yes	Yes	Yes		
InputKing	Chinese (traditional Chinese and simplified Chinese), Japanese and Korean.					Browser based
im-ja	Japanese	Yes		Yes		
kinput2	Japanese	Yes				kinput2 protocol
Nunome	Japanese					Qtopia
ATOKX	Japanese	Yes		Yes		
ami	Korean	Yes				
imhangul	Korean			Yes	Yes	
Nabi	Korean	Yes				
qimhangul	Korean		Yes			
xvnkb	Vietnamese	Yes				
x-unikey	Vietnamese	Yes				
