= Anthy =

Free Japanese conversion engine software

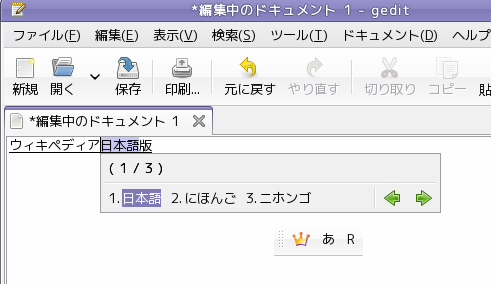
Ibus anthy on gedit

Anthy (Japanese: アンシー, romanized: Anshī) is a package for an input method editor backend for Unix-like systems for the Japanese language. It can convert Hiragana to Kanji as per the language rules. As a preconversion stage, Latin characters (Romaji) can be used to input Hiragana. Anthy is commonly used with an input method framework such as ibus, fcitx or SCIM.

As of January 2014, ibus-anthy is mature and stable, and can be used to author Japanese documents in LibreOffice version 4.1 by typing Romaji on a U.S. keyboard into a U.S. English localized LibreOffice installation. The Romaji is converted to Hiragana on-the-fly, and the Hiragana is likewise optionally converted to Kanji, with multiple Kanji equivalents presented for selection. The interface is well integrated into LibreOffice.

Anthy is free software released under the GNU GPL v2.

The input method is named after Anthy Himemiya, a character from the anime Revolutionary Girl Utena.

== History and development status ==
Anthy was originally hosted at SourceForge.JP. Upstream development effectively stopped in February 2009, after which bug fixes and feature additions were maintained informally by various distributions and individual contributors rather than through a centralized project.

The Anthy library is released under the GNU Lesser General Public License version 3 or later (LGPLv3+), with most individual source files also available under LGPLv2 or later; its bundled dictionary data, taken from the "Alternative Cannadic" project, is licensed separately under GPLv2.

Because of the stalled upstream development and reported accuracy issues in Anthy's core conversion algorithm, Fedora adopted a new engine, libkkc, along with its IBus front-end ibus-kkc, as the default Japanese input method starting with Fedora 19 in 2013, replacing ibus-anthy.

Several forks have continued maintenance of the Anthy codebase after the original project's stagnation, including anthy-unicode, maintained for Fedora, and a combined fork merging the Debian and anthy-unicode codebases.

== Packaging ==
Anthy has been packaged for numerous Linux distributions, including Debian, Scientific Linux, and openmamba.
