= UIM (disambiguation) =

UIM or Uim may refer to:

== Science and technology ==
- uim, a multilingual input method framework
- UIM (card), used in mobile phones

== Organizations ==
=== Politics ===
- Ulster Independence Movement, the British political party
- United Independent Movement, the South African political party

=== Sports ===
- Union Internationale Motonautique, the governing body for motorboat racing
- Union Internacional Manila F.C., a Filipino professional football club based in Manila

=== Military ===
- Unit Interventie Mariniers, a Dutch special forces unit
- Union de Industrias Militares, the Cuban military–industrial complex
