= Panasonic ELUGA power =

2012 Japanese smartphone model

ELUGA power P-07D
- Brand: NTT Docomo
- Manufacturer: Panasonic Mobile Communications
- First released: August 10, 2012
- Compatible networks: 3G: FOMA (W-CDMA) (800 MHz, 850 MHz, 2 GHz); 2G: GSM (900 MHz, 1800 MHz, 1900 MHz); Cellular networks: 3.9G: Xi; 3G: FOMA (HSDPA / HSUPA); 2G: GSM; Wireless LAN (IEEE 802.11b/g/n)
- Form factor: Bar
- Color: BLACK
- Dimensions: 136 mm × 70 mm × 9.4 mm (9.8 mm at thickest point)
- Weight: Approx. 129 g
- Operating system: Android 4.0.4
- CPU: 1.5 GHz dual-core Qualcomm Snapdragon S4 MSM8960
- Memory: 1 GB RAM
- Storage: 8 GB ROM
- Removable storage: microSD (up to 2 GB), microSDHC (up to 32 GB), microSDXC (up to 64 GB) (officially supported by Docomo)
- Battery: Duration of stand-by: Approx. 400 hours (3G); Approx. 270 hours (LTE); Approx. 270 hours (GSM); Duration of talk: Approx. 360 minutes (3G); Approx. 450 minutes (GSM)
- Charging: Approx. 160 minutes Approx. 220 minutes
- Rear camera: Approx. 8.1 megapixels CMOS image sensor, HD 720p video recording
- Front camera: Approx. 1.3 megapixels CMOS image sensor
- Display: 5-inch TFT LCD, HD (1280 × 720 pixels), approx. 16.77 million colors
- Connectivity: Bluetooth 3.0 with HSP, HFP, OPP, A2DP, AVRCP, SPP, HID, and PBAP
- Data inputs: iWnn
- Other: FeliCa

The docomo NEXT series ELUGA power P-07D is a dual-mode smartphone developed by Panasonic Mobile Communications for NTT Docomo that was announced on May 16, 2012 and released on August 10, 2012. It operates on NTT Docomo's 3.9G (Xi) and 3G (FOMA) networks, and is classified as part of the docomo NEXT series.

== Specifications ==
=== Appearance ===
Physically, the device is housed in a single black color variant, measuring approximately 136 × 70 × 9.4 mm and weighing 129 grams. It is powered by a 1.5 GHz dual-core Qualcomm MSM8960 processor, supports expandable storage up to 64GB via microSDXC, and includes an 8.1-megapixel camera.

=== Hardware ===
The device is powered by a 1.5 GHz dual-core Qualcomm MSM8960 processor. It includes a variety of built-in functionalities, such as water resistance, mobile payment capabilities, and internet tethering. For photography and video, it is equipped with a rear-facing 8.1-megapixel CMOS primary camera, as well as a front-facing 1.3-megapixel CMOS secondary camera.

=== Software ===
The device features "Smart Arch" integration with select Panasonic Let's note laptop models, enabling users to perform remote desktop operations and transfer files between devices. This function allows for the remote operation of a connected laptop even while it is in sleep mode, such as when it is stored inside a bag.

For security, the device is equipped with a "Personal Protect" feature that secures specific folders—including documents and photos—as well as the email application. It supports a wide variety of authentication methods, including traditional passwords and PINs, multiple gesture-based patterns, and unlocking via Edy contactless smart cards.
