= 9Q =

9Q or 9-Q may refer to:

- 9Q, IATA code for PBair
- 9Q, Aircraft registration for the Democratic Republic of the Congo
- 9q, an arm of Chromosome 9 (human)
- 9Q, designation for one of the Qumran Caves
- GCR Class 9Q, a class of British 4-6-0 steam locomotive

== See also ==
- Q9 (disambiguation)
