= Aquos Phone Serie ISW16SH =

2012 smartphone model

AQUOS PHONE SERIE ISW16SH (SHI16)
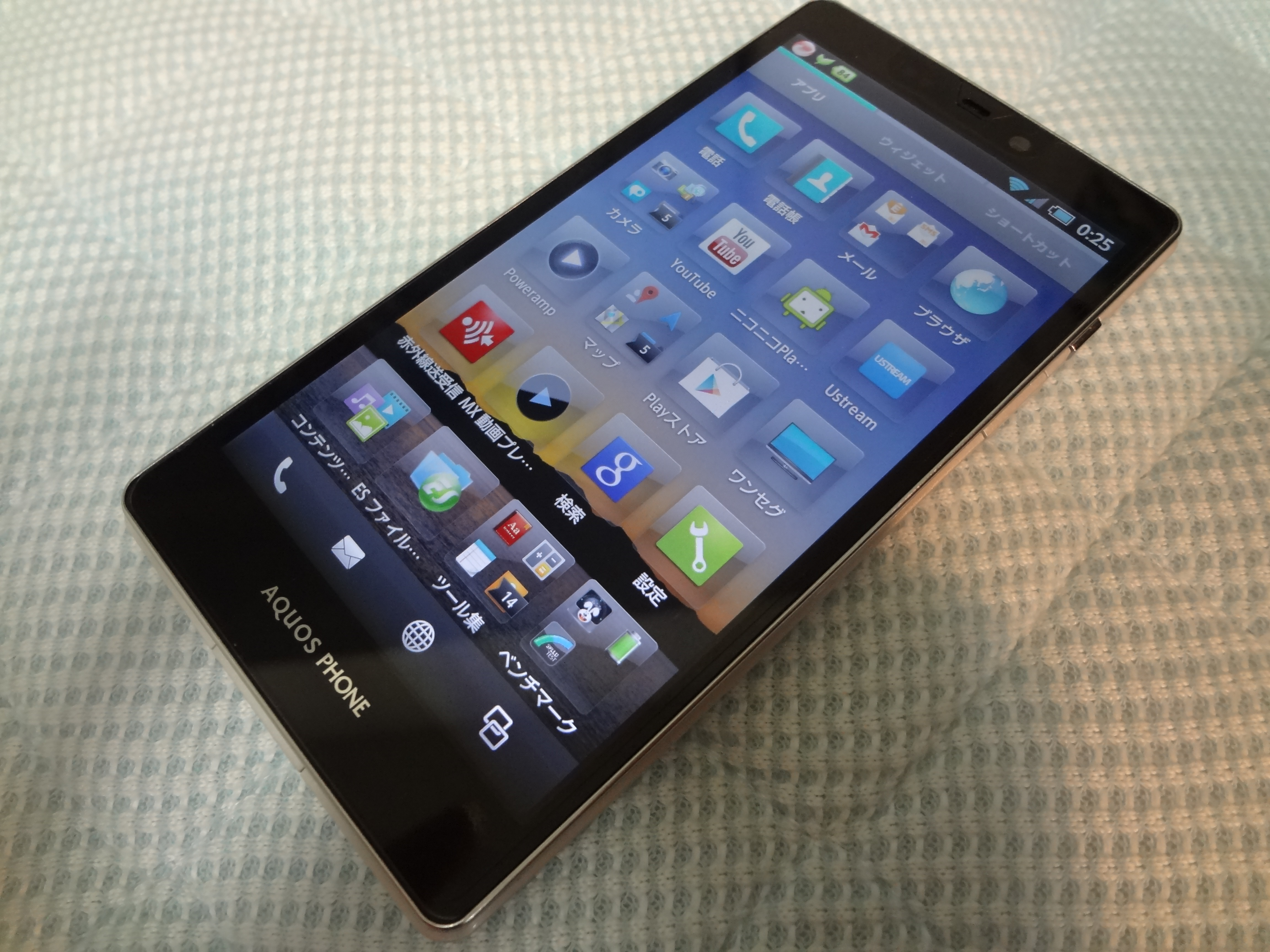
- Front
- Brand: au
- Manufacturer: Sharp
- First released: June 28, 2012; 14 years ago
- Compatible networks: 3G: CDMA2000 1xMC (CDMA 1X WIN) (New 800 MHz/2 GHz), W-CDMA (850 MHz/2 GHz); 2G: GSM (1.9 GHz/1.8 GHz/900 MHz)
- Form factor: Bar (Waterproof & Dustproof)
- Color: White
- Dimensions: 126 mm (5.0 in) H 66 mm (2.6 in) W 11.2 mm (0.44 in) D
- Weight: 136 g (4.8 oz) (approx.)
- Operating system: Android 4.0.4
- CPU: 1.5 GHz Qualcomm Snapdragon S4 (MSM8660A)
- Memory: 1 GB RAM
- Storage: 16 GB ROM (Internal Storage: 16 GB)
- Removable storage: microSD (up to 2 GB), microSDHC (up to 32 GB), microSDXC (up to 64 GB) ※ Figures officially supported by KDDI
- SIM: microSIM (au IC card)
- Battery: 1,800 mAh; Stand by: 360 hours (within Japan) + Combination of moving and stationary Talk: 510 minutes (within Japan)
- Rear camera: Approx. 12.11 megapixels, CMOS, autofocus, Full HD video recording (1080p)
- Front camera: Approx. 310,000 pixels, CMOS
- Display: 4.6-inch high-transmittance CG Silicon LCD touchscreen, HD (720 × 1280 pixels), approx. 16,777,216 colors
- Connectivity: 3.9G: +WiMAX (WiMAX IEEE 802.16e-2005); 3G: CDMA2000 1xEV-DO MC-Rev.A (WIN HIGH SPEED), UMTS (W-CDMA); Other: Wireless LAN (IEEE 802.11a/b/g/n 5 GHz/2.4 GHz)
- Model: AS38
- Made in: China
- References: 1. SAR value: 0.848 W/kg; 2. HDMI output via MHL shared microUSB port 3. Bluetooth Ver 3.0; 4. Input system: iWnn IME for Android SH Edition (Handwriting input supported); 5. Osaifu-Keitai (FeliCa) / NFC supported 6. Infrared communication supported (IrSimple/IrSS); 7. One Seg broadcasting supported

The AQUOS PHONE SERIE ISW16SH is a smartphone developed by Sharp for the Japanese domestic market. It is part of the IS series released under the au brand by KDDI and Okinawa Cellular Telephone Company, featuring compatibility with CDMA 1X WIN and +WiMAX (WiMAX) data networks. Its production model number is SHI16 and its manufacturer model designation is AS38.

It was released on June 28, 2012. Similar to the Summer 2011 AQUOS PHONE IS12SH (SHI12) and Winter 2011 AQUOS PHONE IS13SH (SHI13), the production volume and shipments for this standard domestic-manufacturer model were relatively small. It vanished from store shelves within six months, rendering it unavailable for purchase in several regions.

It was the world's first smartphone to feature dual compatibility with both NFC and FeliCa technologies, according to research by Sharp.

== Specifications ==
=== Hardware ===
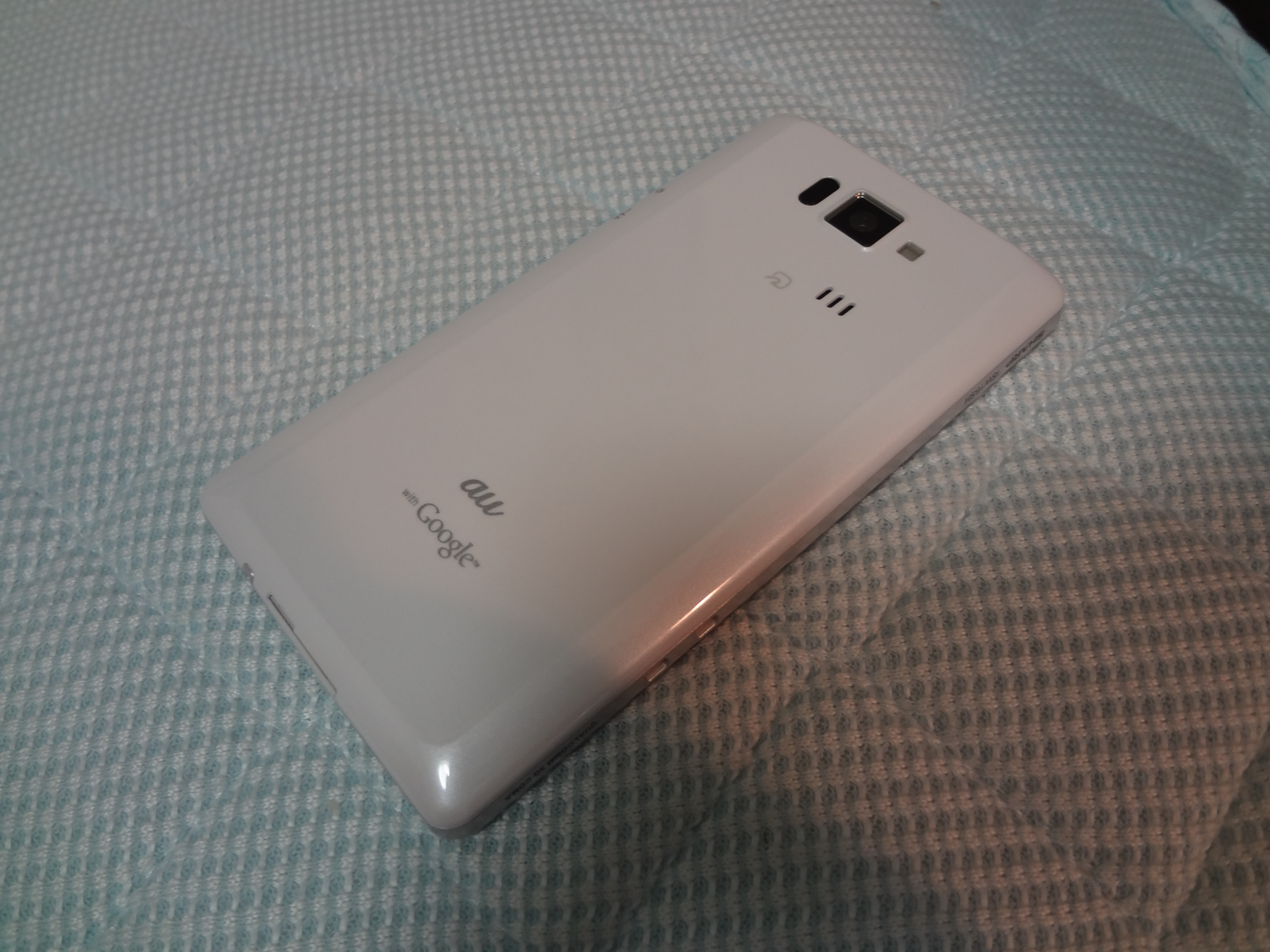
Rear panel view

The ISW16SH stands as the only WiMAX-compatible device among Sharp's smartphone lineup for au. It features a 4.6-inch HD display and is officially the first model in the lineup to support microSDXC cards up to 64 GB. The name "SERIE" means "pinnacle" or "supreme summit."

The device runs on the Android 4.0 operating system and is powered by a 1.5 GHz dual-core Qualcomm MSM8660A chipset. It features 16 GB of internal storage and utilizes a microSIM card slot.

=== Camera ===
The device features a dual-camera system equipped with a 12.11-megapixel back-illuminated CMOS sensor and a secondary 0.31-megapixel CMOS sensor. Video output is available via HDMI using a compatible MHL cable. The front of the device lacks physical buttons, utilizing on-screen navigation for the back and home keys instead.

=== Connectivity ===
For mobile payments, its Osaifu-Keitai feature expands beyond traditional Japanese FeliCa technology to also support the global standard NFC. It is the world's first smartphone to feature dual compatibility with both FeliCa and NFC on a single device. In addition to the traditional Back, Home, and Menu keys, a fourth "App Switching Key" introduced starting with Android 3.x is displayed on-screen at the bottom when the display is active. Since these four navigation buttons exist inside the software Navigation Bar, they may dynamically alter depending on the running application.

=== Software ===
The device comes equipped with the default Android stock browser. Additionally, users can download and utilize Google Chrome from the Google Play Store.

Users can browse and download content from the native Google Play Store (formerly known as the Android Market) as well as the carrier's dedicated au Market (formerly known as the au one Market).
