= WNN (disambiguation) =

World News Now is an American overnight news broadcast seen on ABC.

WNN may also refer to:

- Wnn, a Japanese text input system
- Wennington railway station, Wennington, Lancashire, UK
- Winnemucca (Amtrak station), Nevada, US
- World Nuclear News, the news service of the World Nuclear Association
- Wunnumin Lake Airport, Ontario, Canada
