= Fujitsu Regza Phone IS04 =

2011 smartphone developed by Toshiba

REGZA Phone IS04
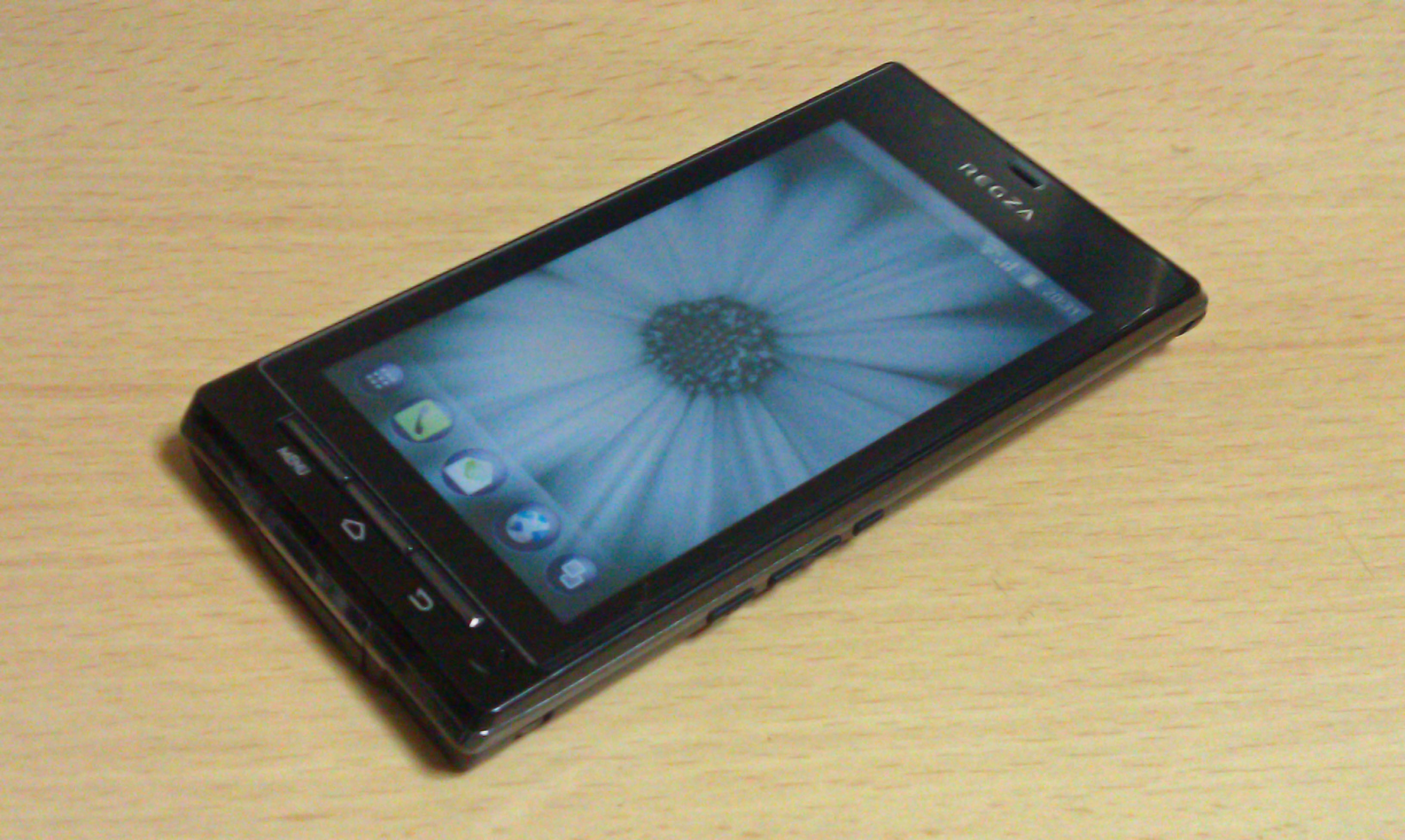
- REGZA Phone IS04 (Front)
- Brand: au
- Developer: Toshiba
- Manufacturer: Fujitsu Toshiba Mobile Communications
- Type: Smartphone
- Series: IS series
- First released: February 10, 2011
- Compatible networks: CDMA2000 1xMC; WIN HIGH SPEED (CDMA2000 1xEV-DO MC-Rev.A)
- Form factor: Slate
- Colors: Black; White
- Dimensions: 126 mm (5.0 in) H 62 mm (2.4 in) W 11.9 mm (0.47 in) D
- Weight: 149 g (5.3 oz)
- Operating system: Android 2.1 (Upgradable to 2.2)
- CPU: 1.0 GHz Qualcomm Snapdragon S1 QSD8650
- Storage: 400 MB
- Removable storage: microSD (up to 2 GB), microSDHC (up to 32 GB)
- Battery: 1300 mAh
- Rear camera: 12.2 MP CMOS, autofocus, HD (1280×720) video recording
- Display: 4.0 in (102 mm) TFT LCD, 854 × 480 px (Wide VGA+)
- Water resistance: IPX5/IPX7
- Model: TSI04 / TG03-KDDI
- Made in: China

The REGZA Phone IS04 is a smartphone developed by Toshiba and manufactured by Fujitsu Toshiba Mobile Communications (under the Toshiba brand, currently FCNT) for the Japanese market. Released by KDDI and Okinawa Cellular Telephone under the au brand as part of the IS series, it supports CDMA 1X WIN (later au 3G). The manufacturing model number is TSI04, and the manufacturer model number is TG03-KDDI.

== Overview ==
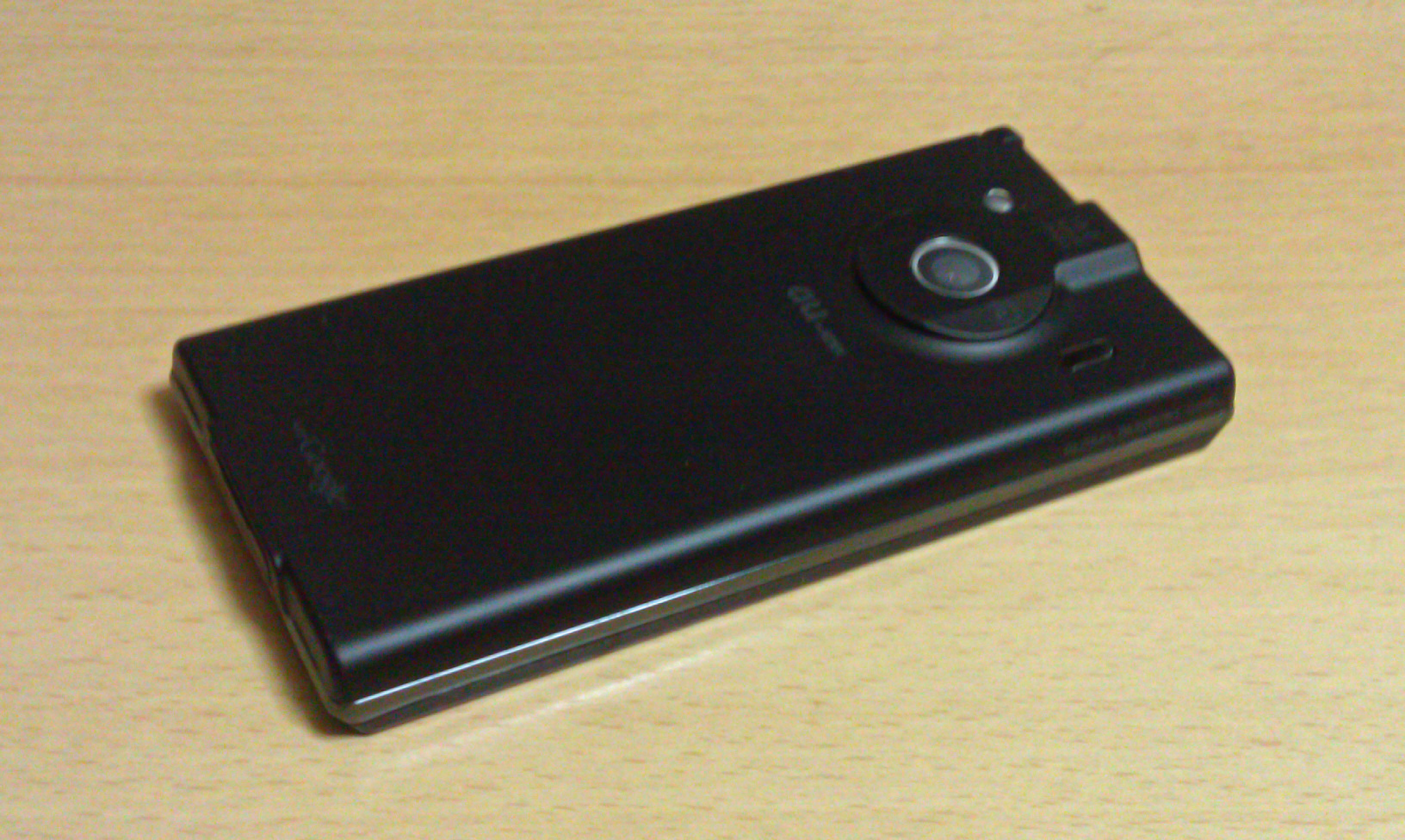
Back panel of the IS04

Officially announced by KDDI and Fujitsu Toshiba on October 18, 2010, and released on February 10, 2011, it is the first Android device under the Toshiba (T/TS) code for au. Among domestic Android smartphones in Japan, it is a sister model to the T-01C (TG03-DCM) released by NTT Docomo, which was officially announced on November 8, 2010, and released on December 17, 2010. It supports features specific to Japanese feature phones, such as IPX5/IPX7 waterproof rating, 1seg TV tuner, infrared communication (IrDA), and Osaifu-Keitai (FeliCa).

Additionally, it is equipped with the Mobile REGZA Engine, allowing users to enjoy 1seg TV broadcasts in high picture quality.

While many Android smartphones adopted iWnn for Japanese text input, this model adopts ATOK. It was the only Android smartphone released in Japan in 2011 with Android 2.1 at launch, with an upgrade to version 2.2 commencing in June 2011 with LISMO availability. As of June 2011, it was the only smartphone supporting the Bluetooth HID profile, enabling the use of Bluetooth keyboards.

The TV commercials for this device were conducted under the Fujitsu brand name, identical to the T-01C. Unlike the T-01C, which was practically handled as a Fujitsu device at Docomo, this model was handled as a Toshiba brand device at au as before.
