= Sogou Pinyin =

Chinese Pinyin input method editor software

- Screenshot of Sogou Pinyin
- Developer: Sohu
- Initial release: 2006; 19 years ago
- Stable release: 15.11 / 21 November 2025; 23 days ago
- Operating system: Windows XP, Windows Vista, Windows 7, Windows 8, Windows 10, Ubuntu, Mac OS X, Symbian S60, Windows Mobile, Android, iOS, OpenHarmony, HarmonyOS
- Available in: Simplified Chinese, Traditional Chinese
- Type: Input method
- Website: pinyin.sogou.com

Sogou Pinyin Method (Chinese: 搜狗拼音输入法; pinyin: Sōugǒu Pīnyīn Shūrùfǎ) is a popular Chinese Pinyin input method editor developed by Sohu.com, Inc. under its search engine brand name, Sogou.

Sogou Pinyin is a dominant input software in China. By July 2011, Sogou Pinyin had an 83.6% penetration rate with more than 300 million users.

== Features ==
Sogou Pinyin provides features for customizing its dictionary, appearance and function. The dictionary of Sogou Pinyin can be enriched by adding so-called cell dictionaries, which contain words in special fields. The appearance of Sogou Pinyin can be changed using skins and animation. The function of Sogou Pinyin can be extended using extensions such as mouse-writing. Beside Pinyin input, it also includes stroke count method input.

== Copyright conflict with Google Pinyin ==
In April 2007, Sohu threatened to sue Google because after Google Pinyin's initial release, it was soon discovered that Google Pinyin's dictionary database contained employee names of Sogou Pinyin. On April 8, 2007, Google admitted that they used "non-Google database resources". Shortly thereafter, a new version of Google Pinyin was released which no longer appeared to be based on Sogou's database.

== Sogou Cloud Pinyin ==
In 2009, Sogou launched a Bookmarklet named Sogou Cloud Pinyin (搜狗云输入法) that can allow any major browser to input Chinese characters on a webpage without installing any new software or plugins. It uses JavaScript and Ajax on the browser and apparently cloud computing technology on the servers.

== See also ==
- Google Pinyin
- Microsoft Pinyin IME
