= Q9 =

Q9 may refer to:

- The fifth series of Q... (TV series)
- The IATA airline designator of Afrinat International Airlines
- Q9 input method - an input method for Traditional Chinese text
- Q9 (New York City bus)
- MQ-9 Reaper, an American unmanned aircraft.
- Quran 9, at-Tawbah the 9th chapter of the Islamic Holy book
- Audi Q9, an upcoming German full-size SUV

== See also ==
- 9Q (disambiguation)
