= Simplified Cangjie =

Chinese input method

- Traditional Chinese: 速成
Transcriptions
Standard Mandarin
- Hanyu Pinyin: sùchéng
- Bopomofo: ㄙㄨˋ ㄔㄥˊ
Yue: Cantonese
- Jyutping: cuk^{1} sing^{4}

Quick
- Traditional Chinese: 簡易
Transcriptions
Standard Mandarin
- Hanyu Pinyin: jiǎnyì
- Bopomofo: ㄐㄧㄢˇ ㄧˋ
Yue: Cantonese
- Jyutping: gaan^{2} ji^{6}

Simplified Cangjie, known as Quick (Chinese: 速成或簡易) is a stroke based keyboard input method based on the Cangjie IME (Chinese: 倉頡輸入法) but simplified with select lists. Unlike full Cangjie, the user enters only the first and last keystrokes used in the Cangjie system, and then chooses the desired character from a list of candidate Chinese characters that pops up. This method is popular in Hong Kong and Macau, the latter in particular.

Simplified Cangjie is one of the few input methods which has an IME pre-installed on Traditional Chinese-capable personal computers.

== Performance and learning ==
Although described as having an easier learning curve with less errors, Simplified Cangjie users have slower typing speed compared to full Cangjie. The user must choose from a list of candidate characters, which can be compared to "hunt and peck" vs. ordinary touch typing. Because Simplified Cangjie does not promote the full sequence of keystrokes of standard Cangjie, it could leave simplified Cangjie users without knowledge of how to code a character without the disambiguation lists.

== Implementations ==
=== Windows ===
In Windows, Simplified Cangjie is called 'Quick'. Microsoft Quick IME is bundled with all Traditional Chinese editions of Windows 3.1x or higher. Since Office 2007 and Windows 7, Microsoft offers two types of Quick: 'Quick' and 'New Quick'. Both are found under the section for Chinese (Traditional, Taiwan). The main difference between the two is that after the second keystroke, traditional Quick shows its drop down list while 'New Quick' will guess and output a character depending on the context (the New-Quick list needs to be manually invoked with an arrow key). 'New Quick' may also change previous characters of the sentence depending on whether the context changes. Microsoft also claims New-Quick to have an improved learning algorithm.

=== macOS ===
- Sucheng input is part of the standard installation of macOS.

== Adoption ==
=== Hong Kong ===
In Cantonese-speaking Hong Kong, average computer users tend to prefer Simplified Cangjie over the full Cangjie largely due to its ease of use, and also the lack of other input methods available. The Cangjie IME itself has evidence of a strong presence in Hong Kong with it being available on most operating systems and keyboard layouts. As Hong Kong people are generally unfamiliar with phonetic-based input methods designed for Mandarin speakers such as pinyin and zhuyin, these methods are not widely used. Children in Hong Kong learn Chinese in a very different way from their peers in mainland China and Taiwan, not only that they generally learn Chinese in Cantonese instead of Mandarin, but they do not learn any transliteration system until perhaps much later in their lives when they start learning Mandarin. Indeed, children in Hong Kong learn Chinese characters from the very beginning in kindergartens; in contrast, in mainland China and Taiwan, transliteration systems like pinyin or zhuyin are taught first before introducing any Chinese characters to children.

== See also ==
- Chinese input methods for computers
