= Chu Bong-Foo =

Chinese inventor of the Cangjie method (born 1937)

- Chinese: 朱邦復
Transcriptions
Standard Mandarin
- Hanyu Pinyin: Zhū Bāngfù
- Bopomofo: ㄓㄨ ㄅㄤ ㄈㄨˋ

Chu Bong-Foo
- Born: 1937 (age 88–89); Huanggang, China
- Known for: Inventing Tsang-chieh (Cangjie) input method for computers
- Scientific career
- Fields: Computer science

Chu Bong-Foo (born 1937) is the inventor of the Tsang-chieh (Cangjie), a widely used Chinese input method. His input method, created in 1976 and given to the public domain in 1982, has sped up the computerization of Chinese society. Chu spent his childhood in Taiwan, and has worked in Brazil, the United States, Taiwan, Shenzhen and Macau.

== History ==
Chu was born in 1937 in Huanggang, Hubei to father Chu Wan-in, also called Chu Huai-ping (Chinese: 朱懷冰). His family led a wandering life during the turbulent days of mainland China, and they finally settled down in Taiwan. There he studied at a local high school. He was an imaginative teenager who spent so much time reading fiction that it negatively affected his studies. Later he also became interested in cinema. After graduating from Taiwan Provincial Agriculture Institute and his military service, he taught briefly at an elementary school in Hualien. In this period he witnessed the poverty of countryside, and developed a sense of mission for rural development and cultural improvement. Finding teaching not to his taste, he went to Brazil instead to develop his career, only to find life more difficult. Over that period of time, he took up several jobs. It was also during these turbulent times that Chu flirted with the hippie lifestyle and studied at a local conservatory.

== Tsang-chieh ==
His work on Tsang-chieh did not begin until he worked at "Cultural Abril", a publishing house in Brazil, in 1972. From then on, he would dedicate his life to modernizing Chinese information technology. He saw for himself how the Brazilians could, in just one day, translate and publish foreign literature, while the Chinese took at least a year. The technology then, coupled with the complexities of the Chinese script, required a painstaking process of picking up type pieces from an enormous Chinese character set. Moreover, publishers frequently faced the challenge of encountering characters that were not part of their standard character set. Consequently, printing information in Chinese was significantly slower compared to other languages. In 1973, upon his return to Taiwan, he assembled a team to research an efficient method for character lookup using 26 keys on a standard keyboard.

Existing methods of looking up a Chinese character such as looking for its radicals, zhuyin, or romanization give only ambiguous results. On the other hand, while Chinese script has no alphabet, most characters are compounds of a common set of components. Chu assumed that it was possible to encode Chinese characters with a group of 'Chinese alphabets' which can be mapped on a common keyboard. After studying dictionary cut-outs and conducting many tests, the team released a table of 8,000 encoded characters in 1976. This result was unsatisfactory for general use but did however prove the possibility of encoding Chinese in this way.

Chu then enlisted more help, including that of Shen Hung-lian (沈紅蓮) from the Department of Chinese Literature, National Taiwan University. At the same time, Chu also learned about An Wang's encoding scheme. On one hand, Wang's scheme further confirmed the feasibility of the encoding approach. On the other hand, it inspired Chu to think that his encoding scheme should not only be convenient for looking up a character, it should also take the form of the characters into account to make it possible to compose (draw) the character from a code. Chu assumed this could be achieved with the following three steps:

1. choosing adequate rules of decomposition of characters
2. choosing an adequate set of forms as the common components
3. encoding the common components (with "Chinese alphabets")

To achieve these steps, the team employed a principle similar to the "pictophonetic compounds" principle of Chinese. In 1977 the team released the first generation of the method that would later be named "Tsang-chieh". The team selected a set of less than 2,000 components to compose about 12,000 common characters. Each component is represented by a permutation of 1 to 3 of 26 "Chinese alphabets" (also called "radicals"). Each "alphabet" maps to a particular letter key on a standard QWERTY keyboard.

In 1978, he implemented the method with computer technology, making it a Chinese input method for computers. The ROC Defense Minister Chiang Wei-kuo gave the input method the name "Tsang-chieh". Chu put Tsang-chieh method in the public domain in a bold effort to promote Chinese computing, essentially giving up his rights to any royalty. His contribution led many future Chinese systems to come bundled with a free copy of the Tsang-chieh input method, removing the greatest barrier to effective Chinese input systems. Since then, many adaptations of Chu's methods have also appeared.

Over generations of upgrades, Chu's Tsang-chieh has included more and more characters. The fifth generation, released in 1985, included 60,000 characters.

== "Chinese computer" ==
During the development of Tsang-chieh method, Chu found that his invention is not only an input method, but also a character encoding method for computing systems. Unlike An Wang's encoding method of the time, or later methods such as Big5 and Unicode, Tsang-chieh method does not sort characters by their usage frequency, stroke count, or radical, but is based on their composition aspect and inspired by the "pictophonetic compounds" principle of Chinese.

Chu therefore began to develop a theory (which he would later call "Chinese DNA", "Alphabets of Chinese Language", or "Chinese character gene" theory). The theory states that the forms selected by Chu are the "genes" of Chinese. Proper arrangement of these "genes" can provide all functions of the characters. Therefore, Tsang-chieh method as a character encoding is very useful, since it contains not only an ordered set of characters, but also precise references of shapes, pronunciations and semantics of the characters. Therefore, the system is an efficient base for a variety of Chinese information technology: smart dictionary; operating system and application software; programming language; hardware architecture of PC and embedded systems; and even strong artificial intelligence.

In 1979, he invented a character generator program, which takes Tsang-chieh encoded data and dynamically generates Chinese characters for screen display. In the same year, Chu's team collaborated with the Acer company, and the program became incorporated in the firmware of a "Chinese computer". Later the generator was also used in the "Tsang-chieh controller board", which would enable an Apple II computer to display Chinese characters in its hi-res graphics mode. A particular interesting "feature" of this early system was that it would also take and generate characters not explicitly included in the codepage, but implied by the rules of Tsang-chieh.

Since then, Chu has held unique views on Chinese information technology. He considered input using ordinary keyboards more feasible and compatible than speech and handwriting recognition or specialized keyboard. However, many of his other opinions have been at odds with consensus:

- He uses a nationalist rhetoric on the subject.
- He values written Classical Chinese over various forms of vernacular Chinese. He also values it over many synthetic languages and their writing systems in the world.
- On the encoding issue, he said that the proposed Big5 13,053 characters codepage too small and too fixed.
- On the display of Chinese, he believes that the job should be done by the "calculation" of a computer's central processing unit, while the use of lookup tables and storage units should be kept to a minimum.
- He believes that Chinese information technology should take second-mover advantage and choose an alternative path from then-established Western theories.
- He also believes that the technology should be rooted in levels as basic and economical as possible. Instead of providing Chinese access at the operating system and application level on standard PC platforms, he believes it should be available at much lower levels using specialized firmware and hardware, which can be used in a wide variety of products. He also believes some programming languages containing syntax and tokens based on (Classical) Chinese language are necessary.

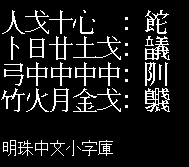
Demonstration of character generator Mingzhu's capability of generating the characters according to the codes. None of the examples are included in Unicode. The first character is "[飠它]", which is for a kind of soup in Xuzhou. Other characters are never recorded. Mingzhu was modified from Juzhen.

In early 1990s, when the Chinese version of Microsoft Windows 3.0 attempted to enter Taiwanese market, Chu and some partners competed with it and advocated for more independence of Chinese information technology. Chu worked in Shenzhen with a group of developers and produced a software application for Chinese integration, called "Juzhen" (Chinese: 聚珍), stood up against this strong force. It was released to the public domain, and distributed through the Rexun magazine. Between Chu and the financially strong Microsoft, the odds were against the former. However, Chu's engine had the benefit of space: in Chu's engine, a font containing 13095 characters took up at most a megabyte each and fit snugly on a floppy disk as compared to the 3–5 megabytes required by competitors' products. This strong advantage of Chu's technology led a sizeable number of technology companies to initiate discussions with Chu for a transfer of technology rights. Soon after, Jinmei (金梅), Zangzhu (藏珠) and other budget font makers swamped the market, forcing prices down and ensuring that every user could afford original copies of Chinese typefaces.

After "Juzhen" system, Chu left Taiwan for Macau. In 1999, he was appointed vice chairman of Culturecom Corporation.

== Seven years with Culturecom ==
Since 1999, Chu became a vice chairman of Hong Kong- and Macau-based Culturecom Corporation, Chu's team has been cooperating with Culturalcom until 2006 when Culturecom terminated this partnership.

Several products and technology were developed respectively, and resulted a series of E-book device with several names such as 文昌, 蒼頡. The core of the device is "Culturecom 1610", a RISC, system-on-a-chip "Chinese CPU" that includes a character generator. The device also features a "Cholesterol" LCD, which saves electricity. The device, similar to India's Simputer, features simple architecture and low cost. Chu's team designed it as an affordable electronic textbook for poor rural population. They also wished it to be the platform of a rural wireless network project named "eTown". However, up to 2006, these ideals were not realized. In 2002, some details of the product were released to LGPL by the two parties. Although the device did not take-off as expected, its technologies were employed by some other companies in their products, such as Kolin's i-library.

During this period, Chu's team was also interested in virtual cinematography. They have released several feature length animation films.

Chu also gave more elaboration on his "Chinese DNA" theory. Using this theory as basis, Chu's team claimed to be developing:

- a system capable of automatically creating a movie from a written script
- a method of interpreting I Ching's prediction
- a strong artificial intelligence natural language interface named "Little Hsin"

== See also ==
- Chinese BASIC
- Transmeta
