= Fcitx =

CJK input method for Linux

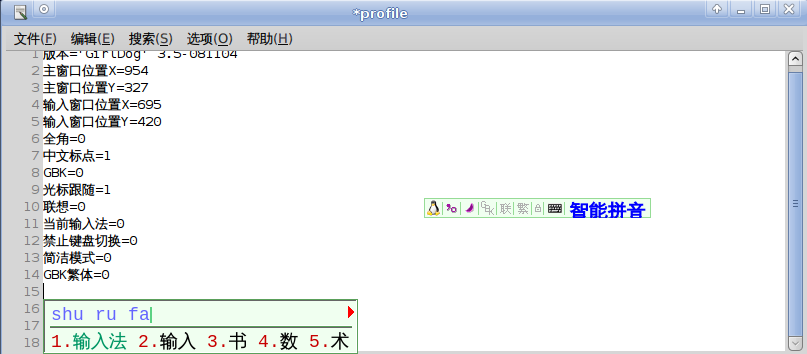
- Fcitx in use with the font WenQuanYi Zen Hei Mono
- Original author: Yuking
- Developers: Yuking, CSSlayer
- Release: August 28, 2002; 23 years ago
- Stable release: 5.1.12 / January 23, 2025; 18 months ago
- Written in: C (Fcitx); C++ (Fcitx 5)
- Operating system: Linux, FreeBSD
- Available in: Chinese
- Type: Input method
- License: LGPL
- Website: fcitx-im.org
- Repository: github.com/fcitx/fcitx (Fcitx); github.com/fcitx/fcitx5 (Fcitx 5)

Fcitx ([ˈfaɪtɪks], Chinese: 小企鹅输入法) stands for Flexible Context-aware Input Tool with eXtension support, is an input method framework with extension support for the X Window System that supports multiple input method engines including Pinyin transcription, table-based input methods (e.g. Wubi method), fcitx-chewing for Traditional Chinese, fcitx-keyboard for layout-based ones, fcitx-mozc for Japanese, and fcitx-hangul for Korean.

It supports UTF-8, GBK and GB 18030 character encodings, can run in Linux and FreeBSD, and supports XIM protocol, GTK+ (both 2 and 3) and Qt input method modules.

Before version 3.6, Fcitx used GBK encoding internally, which has been changed to UTF-8 in the 4.0 release. Since version 4.1, it has become highly modular, and has added support for Google Pinyin (which was ported from the Android version), fbterm, and KDE. The license was changed in the 5.0 release, from GPL to LGPL.

== Features ==
- Theme support
- Systray support
- Kimpanel support (A D-Bus based protocol for input method user interface, oriented from KDE)
- KDE Configuration Module Support
- Global Simplified and Traditional Chinese Conversion support

== Available input method engines ==
Fcitx 4	Fcitx 5	Description
fcitx-anthy	fcitx5-anthy	A Japanese IME using the Anthy engine
fcitx-googlepinyin		A Chinese IME using Google Pinyin which is ported from Android
fcitx-handwriting		A handwriting IME using Zinnia as its backend
fcitx-hangul	fcitx5-hangul	A Korean IME
fcitx-keyboard		An IME based on keyboard layouts
fcitx-kkc	fcitx5-kkc	A Japanese IME using the Kana to Kanji conversion (KKC) engine
fcitx-mozc	fcitx5-mozc	A Japanese IME using the mozc engine
fcitx-m17n	fcitx5-m17n	An engine allowing to use the large number of m17n input methods
fcitx-pinyin	fcitx5-pinyin	A Chinese IME
fcitx-rime	fcitx5-rime	A Chinese IME using the Rime engine
fcitx-qw		Flexible Input Method Framework – QuWei engine
fcitx-skk	fcitx5-skk	A Japanese IME, using the Simple Kana to Kanji conversion (SKK) engine
fcitx-sunpinyin		A Chinese IME using Sunpinyin as its backend
fcitx-table	fcitx5-table	For many table-based Chinese IMEs, e.g. Wubi and Zhengma
fcitx-unikey	fcitx5-unikey	A Vietnamese IME using the Unikey engine
afrim-fcitx	afrim-fcitx	An African IME using the Afrim engine

== Available separate modules ==
- punc: provides full-width punctuation support for CJK users.
- chttrans: provides simplified Chinese conversion to traditional Chinese.
- fullwidth: provides full-width character support.
- cloudpinyin: provides an extra candidate word from web for all Hanyu Pinyin input methods.
- fcitx-configtool: A GTK+ application for configuring fcitx.

== See also ==
- Intelligent Input Bus
- uim
