= Numeric keypad =

Section of computer keyboard

Numeric keypad, integrated with keyboard

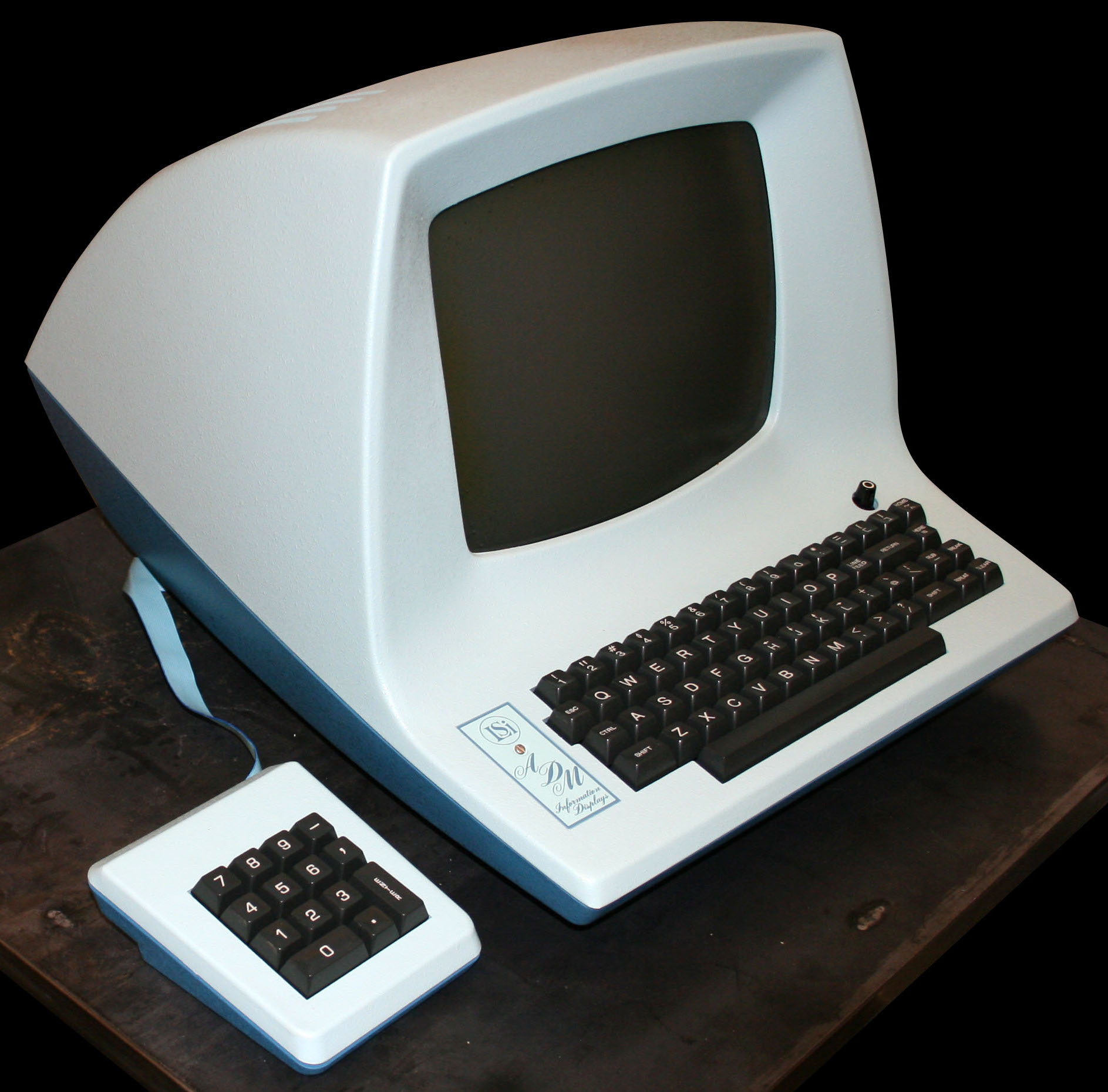
ADM-3A video terminal (1976) with separate keypad

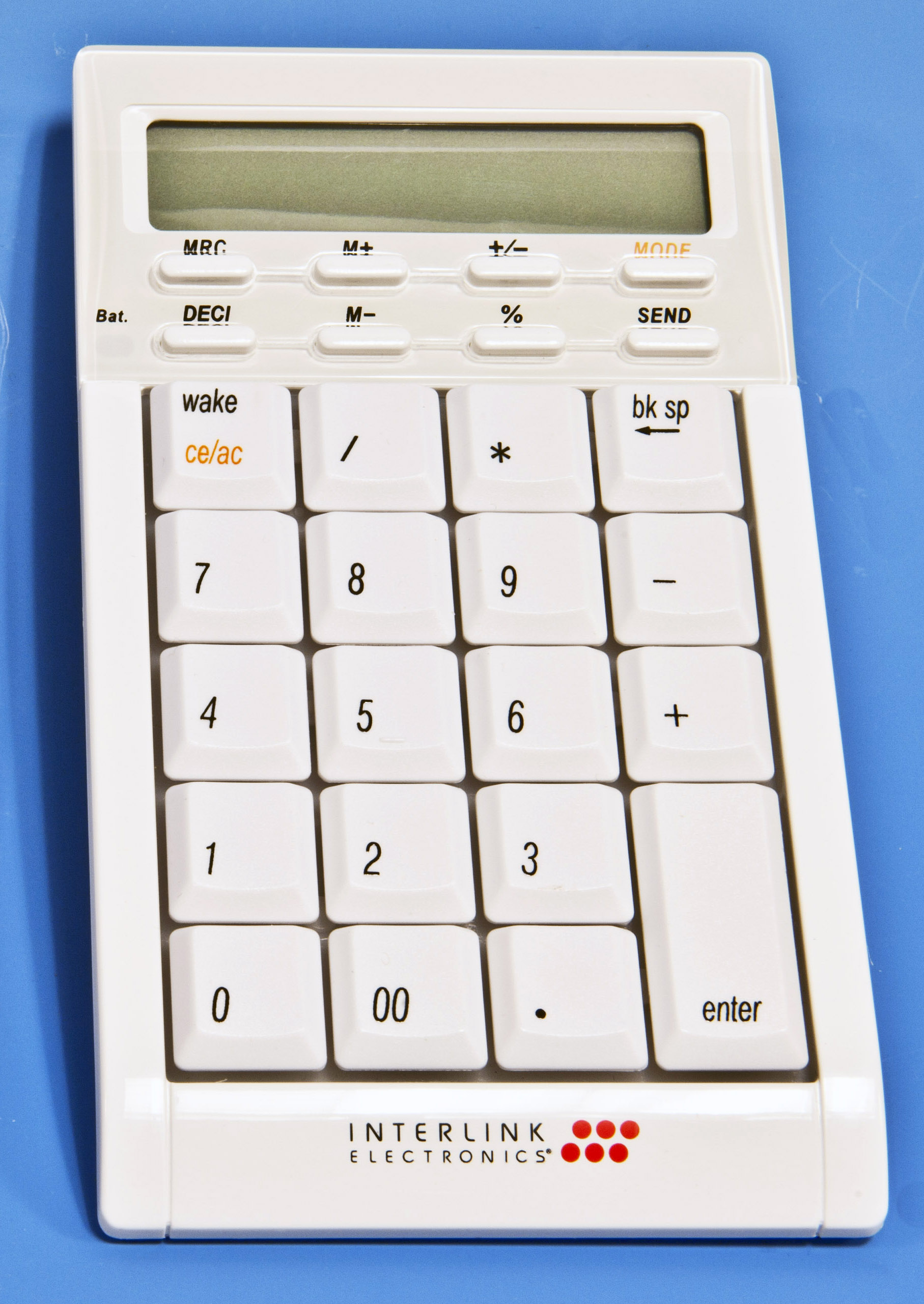
Bluetooth numeric keypad, working also as calculator

A numeric keypad, numpad, or ten key, is the calculator-style grouped ten numeric keys and a few other keys found on some computer keyboards. This grouping allows quick and blind keystroke number entry with one hand, usually the right. Unlike the row of numbers on the main part of a keyboard, a numeric keypad is intended to be used without a modifier key.

On a standard IBM PC keyboard, numpad has 17 keys, including digits 0 to 9, + (addition), - (subtraction), * (multiplication), and / (division) symbols, . (decimal point), Num Lock, and ⌅ Enter keys. On smaller keyboards (such as those found on laptops), the numeric keypad can be implemented as alternative markings on alphabetic keys (usually I-O-P, K-L-;, ,-.-/) or added as a separate unit, that can be connected to a device by means such as USB; some of these may include keys not found on a standard numpad, such as a spacebar or a 00 (or 000) key.

Sometimes it is necessary to distinguish between a key on the numpad and an equivalent key elsewhere on the keyboard. For example, depending on the software in use, (Note: E.g. Blender makes specific use of numpad keys for several keyboard shortcuts.) pressing the numpad's 0 key may produce different results than pressing the alphanumeric 0 key. (Note: I.e. the 0 key above the letter keys and to the right of the 9 key on a typical QWERTY keyboard.) In such cases, the numpad-specific key may be indicated as e.g. Numpad 0, NumPad0, (Note: E.g. as defined in C#'s System.ConsoleKey enumeration: NumPad0 = 0x60,         NumPad1 = 0x61,         NumPad2 = 0x62,         NumPad3 = 0x63,         ...) Num 0, or likewise to remove ambiguity.

Numeric keypads usually operate in two modes. When Num Lock is off, keys 8, 6, 2, and 4 act like the arrow/navigation keys up, right, down, and left; and 7, 9, 3, and 1 act like Home, PgUp, PgDn, and End, respectively. With Num Lock on, digit keys produce the corresponding digit. On Apple Macintosh computers, which lack a Num Lock key, the numeric keypad always produces only numbers; the Num Lock key is replaced by the Clear key.

The arrangement of digits on numeric keypads with the 7-8-9 keys two rows above the 1-2-3 keys is derived from calculators and cash registers. It is notably different from the layout of telephone Touch-Tone keypads which have the 1-2-3 keys on top and 7-8-9 keys on the third row.

Numeric keypads are useful for entering long sequences of numbers quickly, such as in spreadsheets, financial/accounting programs, and calculators. Input in this style is similar to a calculator or adding machine. Similarly to how the F and J keys on a QWERTY keyboard have raised bars or dots to aid finger placement for touch typists, the 5 key on a numeric keypad may have its own raised bar to assist in entering numbers and calculations by touch. Typically, the middle finger of the right hand will be placed on the 5 key, with the index finger on the 4 key and the ring finger on the 6 key.

A numeric keypad is also useful on Windows PCs for typing alt codes for special symbols; for example, the degree symbol, °, can be typed on these computers by holding down Alt and typing 0176.

To maintain their compact size, most laptops do not include a numeric keypad on their keyboard (though they can sometimes be found on larger models); even some desktop keyboards designed for compactness omit a numpad. To compensate, most such keyboards include Num Lock integrated into a function key (typically F6 or F8) and then press keys like 7 to produce their numpad counterpart.

== Chinese input methods ==
The numeric keypad is used by some systems for input of Chinese characters, for example CKC Chinese Input System and Q9 input method.

== Computer games and mousing alternative ==
A 104-key PC US English QWERTY keyboard layout with the numeric keypad at the far right

Numeric keypads are also used for playing some older computer games where the player must control a character, such as roguelikes and Sid Meier's Pirates!. For keyboards without a numeric keypad, some games provide alternative movement keys, such as classic Rogue's HJKL keys.

The numeric keypad can also be an alternative to the WASD keys for navigation in computer gaming. This can be an attractive option for left-handed people who prefer to use the mouse with their left hand.

Most operating systems have a mouse keys accessibility feature where mouse navigation can be done using the numeric keypad, with the other keys adapted to be mouse buttons.

== See also ==
- Alphonse Chapanis
- Gaming keypad
- Keypad
