= X Input Method =

Input method for X Window System

The X Input Method (or XIM) was the original input method framework for the X Window System.

It predates IBus, Fcitx, SCIM, uim and IIIMF. The specification is published most recently in 1994 by (and copyright held by) the X Consortium. Although rarely used today, XIM is historically notable and has been supported in the enterprise products of IBM and Oracle.
