= MessagEase =

Input method for touchscreen devices

Logo

MessagEase is an input method and virtual keyboard for touchscreen devices. It relies on a new entry system designed by Saied B. Nesbat, formatted as a 3x3 matrix keypad where users may press or swipe up, down, left, right, or diagonally to access all keys and symbols. It is a keyboard that was designed for devices like cell phones, mimicking the early cell phones' limited number of 12 keys.

The most frequently used letters (the large letters in the illustration below) are accessed by a tap. Less common letters are accessed by a slide. Example: Tapping the center square generates an 'o'. Sliding to the left from the same square generates a 'c'. A green trail shows the path of the finger. The keyboard supports multiple user dictionaries, used for word prediction and correction.

The software is developed and patented by ExIdeas, based in Belmont, California. It was first released in 2002 for the Palm, along with a paper in 2003.

== Layout ==
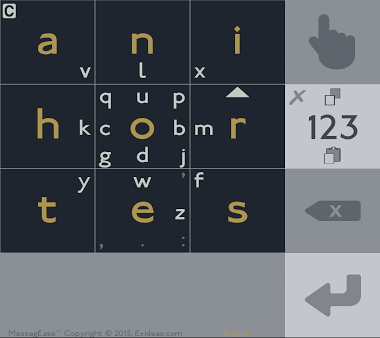
Default keyboard layout

The keyboard layout has a 3x3 matrix that allows for full-text entry. The letter placement is optimized for minimal movement distance between letters, allowing for faster typing.

The layout is 67% more efficient than a standard QWERTY software keyboard, and 31% more than a multi-tap keyboard, when typing is modeled with Fitt's law.

=== One touch keys ===
The 9 most frequent letters in English texts: ETAONRISH, are placed on the keyboard so they can be accessed on a single click.

=== One move keys ===
The next 17 less frequent letters: DLFCMUGYPWBVKJXQZ, are placed as to be triggered by a single move of the finger from or to the central key (O) (except for Z which is centered around the 'E' key together with some punctuation characters). For example, the letter V is typed by dragging the finger from A to O, and the letter D by moving from O to E.

=== Special characters ===
The moves producing special characters, which includes 38 characters including accents and punctuation marks, are displayed on a complete keyboard showing up when the user drags the space bar upwards.

This is not an alternate keyboard in the sense that the key pair moves are valid on both keyboard. It is rather a mnemonic help, which is normally hidden to avoid overwhelming the user with spurious information.

=== Control keys ===
A small vertical bar on the right (or on the left in left-handed mode) gives direct access to the cut/copy/paste operations, the numeric keypad, the uppercase/lowercase control, as well the usual F1-F12 control keys. This is also commanded by moving the finger from one cell to an other.

=== Semantic sugar ===
A set of small movements makes the life of the typist easier, like drawing a small circle or a back and forth movement to write a letter uppercase, or prolonging the movement to put accent on letters.

The keyboard can be resized to fit the need of the user, and is also provided in a double sized version with the numeric keypad on the side of the alphabetic keypad.

== Software ==
The keyboard is currently available for Android devices, iOS devices and the Apple Watch.

=== Subscription Model ===
As of 2024-02, Exideas appears to intend to no longer offer the keyboard for free. A nag screen asks users to join a subscription model. This change is not described on Exideas' web page and has caused numerous users to change their five-star reviews to one star on Google Play.

=== Open-Source Alternatives ===
On Android, "Thumb-Key" is available on F-Droid and Google Play.

"FlickBoard," which enables some gestures that are not supported in Thumb-Key, is available for Android devices on Izzysoft (and via F-Droid if the Izzysoft repository is added), as well as on Google Play.

Currently supported input languages:

- Arabic
- English
- Esperanto
- French
- German
- Greek
- Hebrew
- Hindi
- Italian
- Japanese Katakana
- Japanese Hiragana
- Persian
- Polish
- Portuguese
- Russian
- Spanish
- Thai
- Ukrainian
- Urdu

=== Closed-Source Alternatives ===
On Android, "Tessera Keyboard" is available on Google Play. Unlike Thumb-Key and FlickBoard, Tessera Keyboard attempts to recreate a more refined user experience while retaining the notable features of MessageEase keyboard.

== History ==
MessagEase was released in 2002 for the Palm. It was also originally a competitor to the T9 predictive input method, on a 12-button phone, with 9 number buttons. In this first iteration, each of the 9 primary characters needed to be pressed twice in a row, and secondary characters were entered by first pressing the main button, and then pressing one of the remaining 8 buttons. In this first iteration, because many letters required two presses, it was not significantly faster than the Multi-tap input method.

MessagEase is now exclusively for touch screens, and no longer has physical 12-button support. All characters are now entered by tapping or swiping.
