= Swarachakra =

Indic Language Input Tool
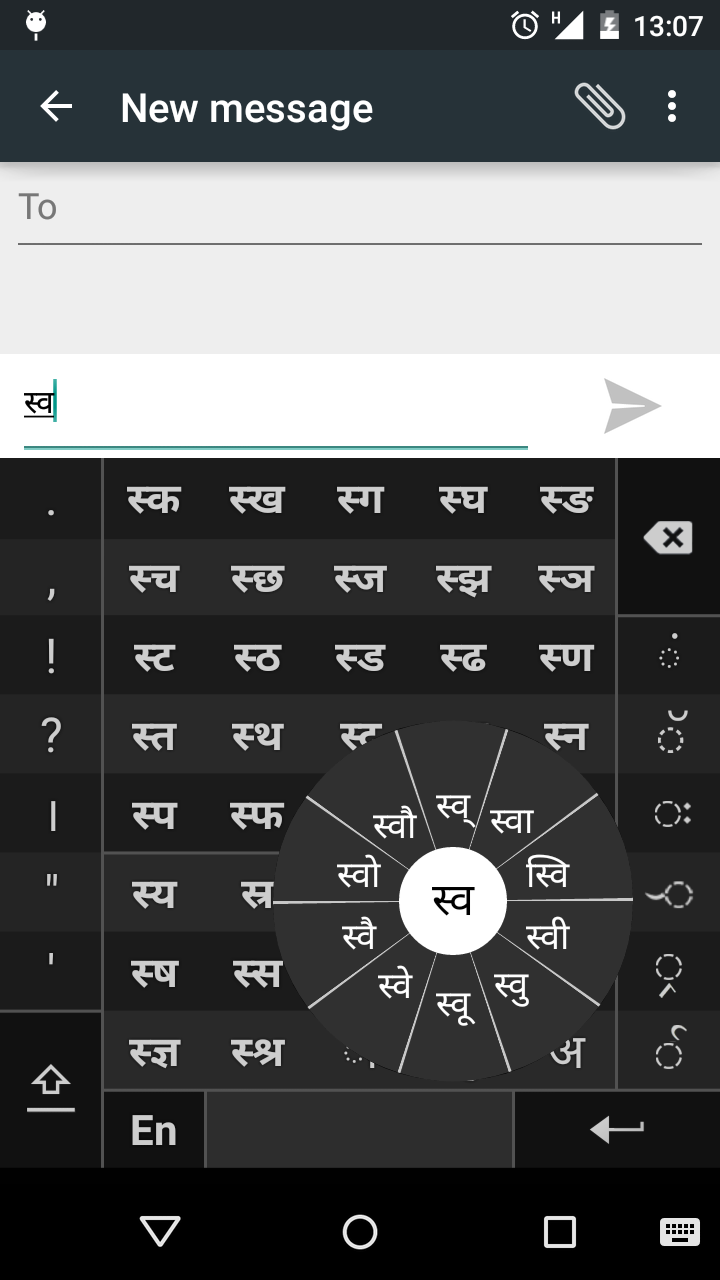
- Swarachakra keyboard with preview of conjuncts, along with chakra for the conjunct 'स्व'
- Developer: IDIN group
- Initial release: 7 June 2013
- Operating system: Android
- Available in: Assamese, Bangla, Gujarati, Hindi, Konkani, Kannada, Malayalam, Marathi, Oriya, Punjabi (Gurmukhi script), Tamil, Telugu
- Type: Virtual keyboard
- License: Apache License
- Website: swarachakra.in

Swarachakra (Devanagari: स्वरचक्र) is a free text input application developed by the IDIN group at Industrial Design Center (IDC), Indian Institute of Technology Bombay for Indic scripts. Swarachakra's alphabetical keyboard layout performed better than the Inscript layout (a QWERTY-based design and government standard in India). As of 2014, it is available for Android devices in twelve languages.

Work on other languages is in progress. This is one of the many projects taken up to develop interactive products for developing countries at IDC.

== Motivation ==
India is a multilingual country with 1,635 languages (including dialects and sub dialects) while Indian currency notes display 15 major languages. Although smartphone penetration is increasing in India, text input in Indic scripts has been a challenge for many years. According to the 2005 India Human Development Survey, the surveyed households reported that 72 per cent of men did not speak any English, 28 per cent spoke some English, and five per cent spoke fluent English. Among women, the corresponding percentages were 83, 17, and 3. While Indian languages are preferred in other means of communication in India (e.g. oral and written communication, radio, TV, newspapers and magazines), English is still the most preferred language for text input.

The focus of this project is to increase the Indian text input on smartphones and tablets. A better text input mechanism will be helpful to people with little or no knowledge of English, and also for those who prefer not to use English.

== Challenges ==
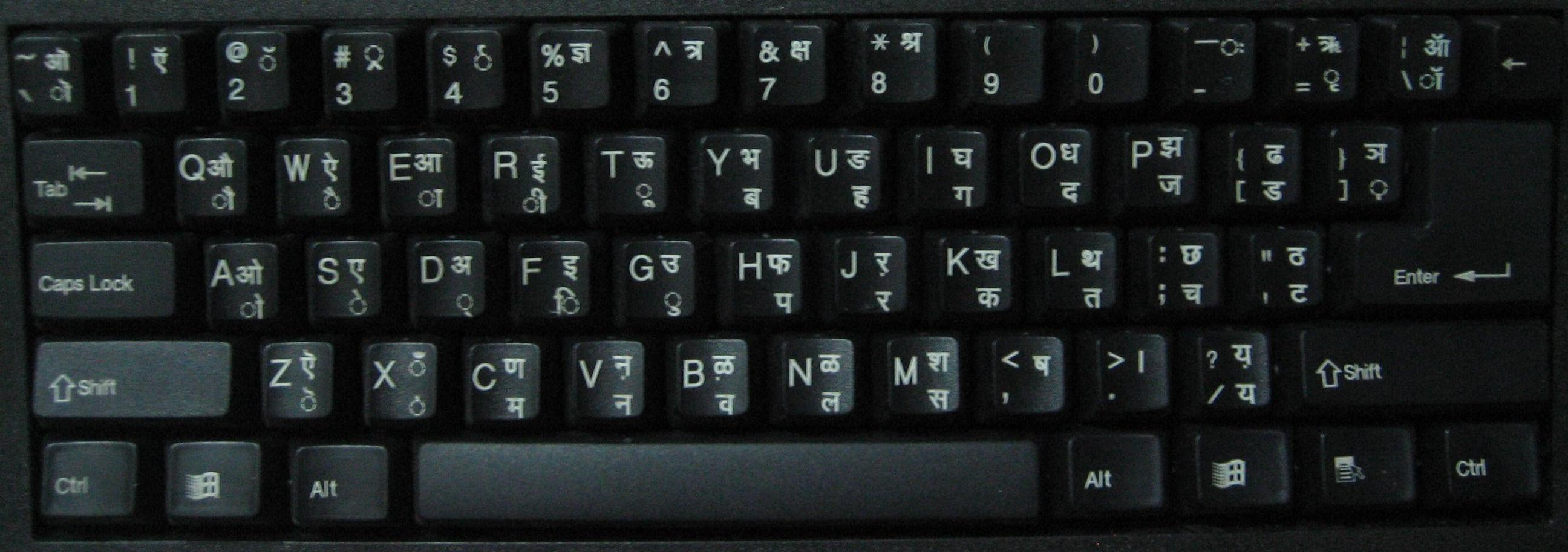
Devanagari INSCRIPT Keyboard

Text entry in Indian Languages has many challenges. Devanagari, for example, requires 52-65 keys to input just the frequently used characters (25 consonants, 9 semi-vowels, 3 frequent conjuncts, 13 vowels, a halant and the 13 vowel modifiers), whereas 26 keys are sufficient to represent Latin script. The government standard Inscript uses 42 keys but takes away many punctuation marks, including commonly used ones such as question marks and quotation marks. Further, it clubs unrelated characters on same key such as म ण, ह ङ, ऍ १, र ३, ज्ञ ५, त्र ६, क्ष ७, श्र. This is believed to be why Inscript and most other qwerty-based text input mechanisms have not become popular up until now.

== History ==
Researchers at IDC have been working on alternatives to QWERTY-based keyboards for Indic text input since 2001. Earlier projects included the design of hardware devices such as Dynakey, Barakhadi, Keylekh and e-Lekh. As mobile phones became smarter and more powerful, this group started working on text input alternatives for mobile phones in 2007 with Saral. Swarachakra and Disha were two designs developed in 2010 for touch-screen devices. In June 2013, Swarachakra was launched on Android devices. As of August 2017, more than 20 lakh people have downloaded Swarachakra from Google play store. Swarachakra has received appreciation from local newspapers in India and international magazines.
