= Q9 input method =

The Q9 input method (Chinese: 九方輸入法), invented by Qcode Information Technology Ltd. of Hong Kong, is an input method that uses only the number keys on a numeric keypad to input Chinese characters into a digital device. Invented in 1999 by Vincent Lau Man-kin, it is considered an easy method to use even though it is a "structural" input method. (Most "structural" methods are considered difficult.) It is used on some mobile phones in Hong Kong. It provides an alternative to Cangjie input method as well, as this utilizes the numeric keypad on personal computers.

Lau's previous experience was as a television screenwriter for three decades. A friend asked Lau in 1999 if he could create an input method capable of using the numeric keypad on the mobile phone to output Chinese characters. He spent three days creating the Q9 input method. Making the input method his company's primary product, he renamed the company from Quick Code Information Technology (Chinese: 快碼資訊科技) to Q9 Information Technology (Chinese: 九方資訊科技).

However, besides its use for cell phones, the use of this input method on personal computers is limited, due to its proprietary nature and that personal computers do not have Q9 input method pre-installed. Since the speed of the input method relies upon using numeric keypad on PCs, this method is impractical for use on most laptops.

Q9 input method is available as an FEP on Symbian S60 3rd Edition mobile devices.

== Basic usage ==
The 9 positions of the number pad are shown with 9 Chinese characters and 9 stroke shapes; the first 5 of these stroke shapes are the same as in the Wubihua method, and the others are more elaborate shapes generated according to context (see below). At any time, you may choose either a character or a stroke shape from any one of the 9 squares (with mobile phones, press 0 to switch between character and stroke shape; with pointing devices, you can point to either one or the other). If the character you want is not available, choose a stroke shape that closest to the character's first stroke (i.e. at the character's top left); the stroke shape in position 5 is a general concept of "other strokes". If the character is still not available, choose either the character's second stroke shape, or elaborate on the first stroke shape (some stroke shapes cause additional elaborations of themselves to appear in positions 6 to 9). If the character is still not available after this second shape has been entered, the third stroke shape to enter is that corresponding to the character's last stroke (usually at bottom right). Finally, if the character is not listed, then you can press 0 to see another page of similar characters (or you may have entered the wrong stroke shapes). Usually, only Traditional Chinese characters are available on the Q9 method, although some versions allow simplified characters to be found as well. Additional controls are usually available to reset the input method's state, and to switch to English letters, digits or punctuation.

== Issues with Q9 on macOS ==
Mac OS X had issues relating to Q9 input. In certain scenarios, the selection bar for the input method would appear gray when being selected. Some older programs support the input method more reliably.

== See also ==
- Chinese input methods for computers
- Predictive text - input technologies for Western texts on mobile phones
