= Fleksy =

Virtual keyboard

- Original author: ThingThing Ltd.
- Initial release: December 2012
- Operating system: iOS; Android; Linux; Unity
- Type: Virtual keyboard
- License: Proprietary
- Website: www.fleksy.com

Fleksy was a proprietary third-party virtual keyboard developed by ThingThing Ltd. for Android and iOS devices. (Note: As of December 2024, the app is no longer listed on Google Play or the Apple App Store.) The keyboard used error-correcting algorithms that analyze the touch region on the keyboard and pass input through a language model to determine the intended word. The application also supported swipe gestures for functions such as inserting spaces, deleting text, and cycling through word suggestions.

== History ==
Fleksy was developed by Fleksy Inc., a company founded in 2011. It was originally developed for the blind and visually impaired to enable typing through muscle memory.

In July 2012, Fleksy became commercially available on the iPhone through Apple's iOS App Store. On June 15, 2016, Fleksy was acquired by Pinterest. In 2017, Fleksy was acquired again by Spain-based company ThingThing Ltd.

In the summer of 2018, Fleksy ran a seed crowdfunding campaign on Crowdcube. Later that year, Fleksy was preinstalled as the default keyboard on Palm devices; the campaign raised over $800,000 through equity crowdfunding.

In October 2019, Fleksy's PEGI rating was temporarily changed to PEGI 12 on Google Play. The original PEGI 3 rating was restored after the company contacted the International Age Rating Coalition.

In 2020, ThingThing pivoted Fleksy toward a B2B model, launching a Software Development Kit (SDK) aimed at third-party developers in sectors including healthcare and productivity. In August 2022, ThingThing launched a developer platform with integration documentation for the SDK.

In January 2024, Fleksy received a grant from Innovate UK to develop mobile security features aimed at combating financial fraud. By late 2024, the consumer app had been removed from both the Google Play Store and the Apple App Store.

== Software ==
Fleksy's auto-correct algorithm functioned through a combination of analysis of user typing patterns and linguistic context. It analyzed tap locations rather than the letters selected, which gave it a degree of tolerance for imprecise input, allowing users to type on an invisible keyboard or even outside the keyboard boundaries in some cases. This behavior made it particularly accessible to the visually impaired community. The software was considered for the "Story of the Year" category of the Technology Year in Review for 2012 by the American Foundation for the Blind.

The keyboard also allowed sighted users to type without looking at the screen. Quentin Stafford-Fraser wrote on his website: "I found I could type whole sentences immediately, without looking at the keyboard".

== Availability ==
Fleksy was available in 82 languages and supported QWERTY, AZERTY, QWERTZ, Dvorak, and Colemak keyboard layouts on Android and iOS. The Fleksy SDK offered autocorrection, next-word prediction, and swipe input for third-party developers.

== Awards ==
Fleksy received a number of awards following its release in July 2012:

- Officially broke the Guinness World Record for fastest touch-screen text message in May 2014
- South by Southwest Interactive Accelerator 2013 Winner
- Apple's Best of App Store 2012
- CES 2013 Innovation honoree
- Qualcomm QPrize finalist
- Royal National Institute of Blind People, app of the month for August 2012
- Golden Apple Award
