= GCR Class 9Q =

Class of British locomotives

GCR Class 9Q LNER Class B7
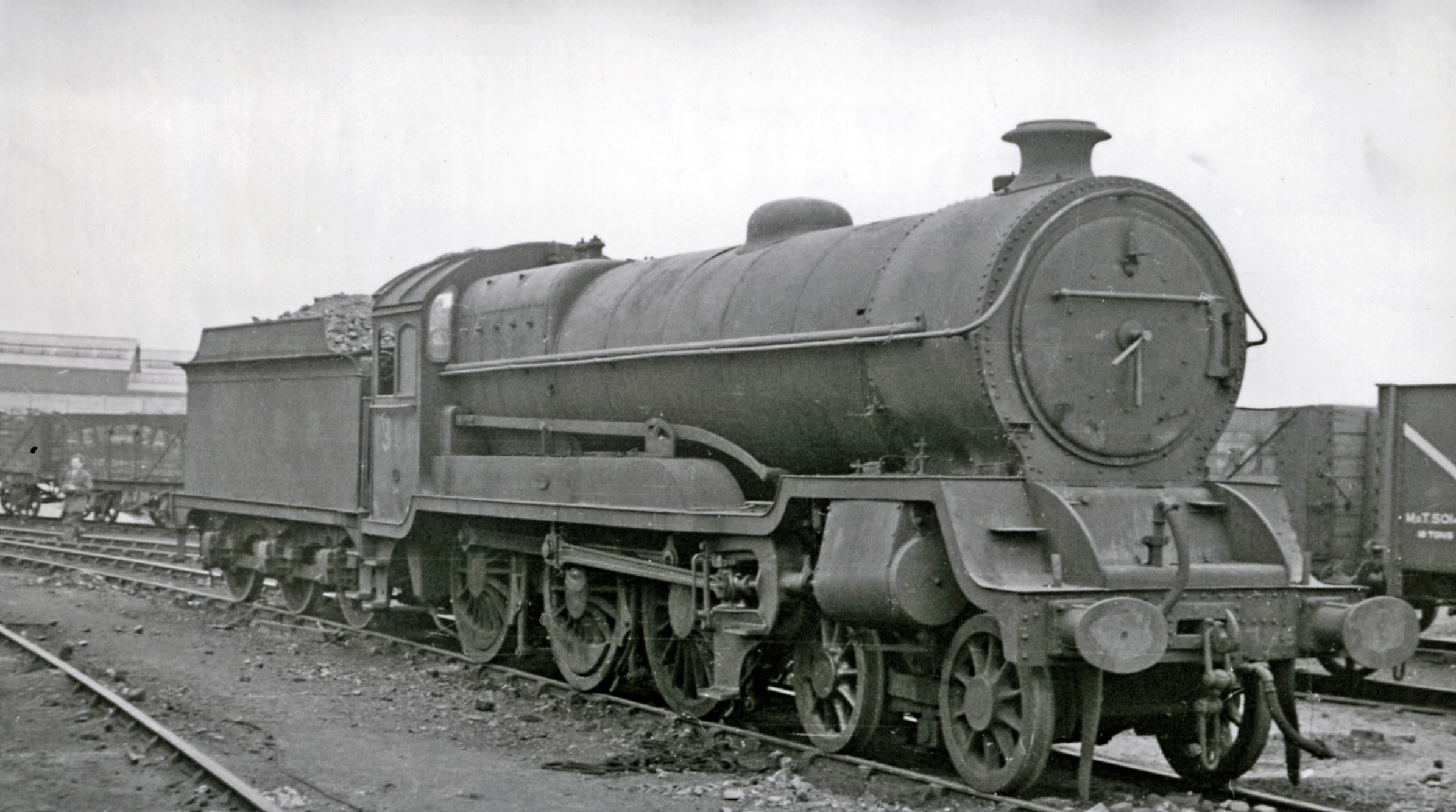
- LNER 1386, (formerly 5034), at Darnall Locomotive Depot in 1949
Type and origin
- Power type: Steam
- Designer: John G. Robinson
- Builder: Gorton Works, (23); Vulcan Foundry, (10); Beyer, Peacock and Company (5)
- Build date: 1921–1924
- Total produced: 38
Specifications
- Configuration
  - Whyte: 4-6-0
  - UIC: 2'C
- Gauge: 4 ft 8 1/2 in (1,435 mm)
- Leading dia.: 3 ft 6 in (1.067 m)
- Driver dia.: 5 ft 8 in (1.727 m)
- Length: 63 ft 0 in (19.202 m)
- Loco weight: 127 long tons (129 t)
- Fuel type: Coal
- Firebox
  - Grate area: 26 sq ft (2.4 m^{2})
- Boiler
  - Diameter: 5 ft 3.5 in (1,613 mm) to 5 ft 6 in (1,680 mm) outside
- Boiler pressure: 180 psi (1.24 MPa)
- Heating surface: 2,044 sq ft (189.9 m^{2})
- Superheater
  - Heating area: 343 sq ft (31.9 m^{2})
- Cylinders: Four
- Cylinder size: 16 in × 26 in (406 mm × 660 mm)
Performance figures
- Tractive effort: 29,953 lbf (133.2 kN)
Career
- Operators: Great Central Railway; → London and North Eastern Railway; → British Railways
- Retired: 1948–1950
- Disposition: All scrapped

The GCR Class 9Q, classified B7 by the LNER, was a class of 4-6-0 mixed traffic locomotives designed by John G. Robinson for fast goods, relief passenger and excursion services on the Great Central Railway. They were a smaller wheeled version of Robinson's earlier Class 9P "Lord Faringdon" express passenger class (LNER Class B3).

== History ==
=== GCR locomotives ===
The GCR built two batches at Gorton locomotive works, during 1921 and 1922, and they also ordered batches from Vulcan Foundry and the Beyer, Peacock and Company. Twenty eight locomotives had been delivered by Grouping in 1923. The GCR found that they were rather heavy on coal - this led to their nickname of "Black Pigs" - although not much worse than other 4 cylinder designs of the time. They were also remarkably quick to say that they had only 5ft 8in wheels and often pulled heavy expresses in the early period of their career.

=== LNER locomotives ===
The London and North Eastern Railway (LNER) ordered a fifth batch of ten locomotives from Gorton works and these were delivered between August 1923 and March 1924.

=== Sub-classes ===
The last batch had reduced boiler mountings and detail differences to the cab to conform to the new LNER loading gauge. These were classified B7/2. The earlier batches were classified B7/1.

All of the class were passed to British Railways in 1948, but withdrawal began soon afterwards. Some locomotives that were still around in 1949 were renumbered to 61702 and 61713 to make more room for Thompson Class B1 locomotives then under construction.

== Preservation ==
None have been preserved.

== Numbering ==
Year	Maker	GCR Nos.	LNER Nos.	LNER 1942 Nos.	BR Nos.	BR 1949 No.
1921	Gorton	72, 73, 78	5072, 5073, 5078	1360–1362	(61360–61362)	—
1921	Vulcan Foundry	36–38, 458–464	5036–5038, 5458–5464	1363–1372	(61363–61372)	61702–61703
1921–22	Gorton	465–474	5465–5474	1373–1382	(61373–61382)	61704–61707
1922	Beyer, Peacock	31–35	5031–5035	1383–1387	(61383–61387)	61708–61709
1923–24	Gorton	475–482, –, –	5475–5484	1388–1397	(61388–61397)	61710–61713
