= Wnn =

Japanese text input system

Wnn (/uːn/, Japanese pronunciation: [ɯnnɯ] or [ɯːnnɯ]) is a Japanese input system. The network-extensible Kana-to-Kanji conversion system was jointly developed and released by the Software Research Group of Kyoto University Research Institute for Mathematical Sciences, Omron Tateisi Electronics Co., and Astec, Inc.

It is distributed as freeware with a licence allowing users to copy and modify the software; however, it is not free software since certain restrictions are placed on the user, including a prohibition on changing the name. The licence is otherwise similar to the (old, containing the advertising clause) BSD licence.

Wnn is used as part of several programs that deal with Japanese text, including JWPce and NJStar's Japanese Word Processor.

The name is derived from the Japanese phrase "Watashi no namae wa Nakano desu" (my name is Nakano), as a design goal of the Wnn project was to be able to enter such a sentence, and have the correct kanji and kana [私の名前は中野です] selected automatically.

Wnn is maintained by the FreeWnn project.

Omron releases a line of Wnn software that was commonly used in Japanese mobile phones.
