= Uim =

Multilingual input method

uim
- Initial release: August 26, 2002; 23 years ago
- Stable release: 1.9.6 / 16 May 2025; 6 months ago
- Repository: github.com/uim/uim
- Type: Input method
- License: BSD license
- Website: github.com/uim/uim/wiki

uim (short for "universal input method") is a multilingual input method framework. Applications can use it through so-called bridges.

== Supported applications ==
uim supports the X Window System legacy XIM (short for X Input Method) through the uim-xim bridge. Many X applications are written in either GTK+ or Qt, which have their own modules dealing with input methods, and uim supports both of these with its GTK+ and Qt immodules.

uim has a bridge for the console (uim-fep), Emacs (uim.el), and macOS (MacUIM).

== See also ==
- List of input methods for UNIX platforms
