= Five-stroke method =

Five-stroke method may refer to the following Chinese input methods:

- Stroke count method (五笔画输入法)
- Wubi method (五笔字型输入法)
