= Biaoxingma method =

Shape-based Chinese character input method invented by Chen Aiwen

- Traditional Chinese: 表形碼輸入法
- Simplified Chinese: 表形码输入法
- Literal meaning: shape-expressing code input method
Transcriptions
Standard Mandarin
- Hanyu Pinyin: biǎoxíngmǎ shūrùfǎ

Alternative Chinese name
- Traditional Chinese: 表形碼
- Simplified Chinese: 表形码
- Literal meaning: shape-expressing code
Transcriptions
Standard Mandarin
- Hanyu Pinyin: biǎoxíngmǎ

The Biaoxingma Input Method (simplified Chinese: 表形码输入法; traditional Chinese: 表形碼輸入法; pinyin: biǎoxíngmǎ shūrùfǎ; lit. 'shape-expressing code input method'), also abbreviated to simply Biaoxingma (simplified Chinese: 表形码; traditional Chinese: 表形碼; pinyin: biǎoxíngmǎ; lit. 'shape-expressing code'), is a kind of shape-based Chinese character input method invented by Chen Aiwen, an overseas Chinese scholar living in France in the 1980s. Because it is intuitive in the splitting of Chinese characters and has theoretical support in Chinese characters, it had once attracted widespread attention at the beginning of the invention and was listed as a key project in China Torch Project. However, there was afterwards no such influence as Wubi method and Zhengma method in terms of popularization and commercialization.

Biaoxingma was pre-installed by Microsoft in Chinese Windows 95 and Windows 98 first edition, but was removed from Windows 98 second edition and later Windows versions.

Biaoxingma was also installed in IBM AIX.

== Basics ==
The smallest constituent parts of each Chinese character are called strokes. One or more strokes form the components of a character. Characters are divided into several components, which are coded to the English letter resembling them. Due to the resemblance of the letter and the character components it refer to, Biaoxingma is easy to learn and remember compared with Wubi method and Zhengma method. Moreover, the biggest advantage of Biaoxingma is that crossed strokes are never divided into two components. In other words, the character components never cross each other. This makes the way of splitting characters very intuitive.

Here are two examples:

"吼" - divided into - O+Z+L = OZL
"啊" - divided into - O+P+T+O = OPTO
