= CIPS =

CIPS may refer to:

- Canadian Information Processing Society
- Chartered Institute of Procurement & Supply
- Center for Integrated Plasma Studies
- Certified Interventional Ultrasound Sonographer, a qualification issued by the World Institute of Pain
- Cross-Border Interbank Payment System, alternative to SWIFT system
- Confédération Internationale de la Pêche Sportive (International Confederation of Sport Fishing)
- Cooperative Institute for Precipitation Systems
- Covington Independent Public Schools
- International Conference on Integrated Power Electronics Systems
- Chinese Information Processing Society of China
- Cook Islands Police Service
