= Chinese Information Processing Society of China =

National academic association in China

- 中国中文信息学会
- Abbreviation: CIPS
- Formation: June 1981; 45 years ago
- Fields: Chinese computational linguistics
- Website: https://www.cipsc.org.cn

The Chinese Information Processing Society of China (CIPS; simplified Chinese: 中国中文信息学会; traditional Chinese: 中國中文資訊學會; pinyin: Zhōngguó Zhōngwén Xìnxī Xuéhuì) is a national academic association in Chinese language technology in the People's Republic of China. It was established in June 1981 and is supervised by the China Association for Science and Technology. The proceedings of the annual conferences on computational linguistics are published by Springer Nature.

== Purposes and activities ==
The purposes of CIPS is to maintain close contact among researchers in the field of Chinese information processing, adhere to the principles of independence and democracy in running the association, and contribute to the development of science and technology. It also shoulders the mission of serving the major needs of the country.

CIPS organizes domestic and international conferences and other academic exchange activities on Chinese information processing and related fields, carries out technical training and consultation, and promotes the development and application of Chinese information technology.

== Professional committees ==
There are professional committees in the areas of: Chinese character glyph information, shorthand, computational linguistics, ethnic language information, machine translation, information retrieval, speech information, social media processing, language and knowledge computing, medical health and bioinformatics, cyberspace search, big data security and privacy computing, open source intelligence technology, large models and generation, and emotional computing.

== Academic journal, conferences and awards ==
The Journal of Chinese Information Processing was founded in 1986. It is a Chinese key academic journal jointly sponsored by the Chinese Information Processing Society of China and the Institute of Software of the Chinese Academy of Sciences.

The China National Conference on Computational Linguistics (CCL) sponsored by the Society was held every two years before 2013, and every year since then. The proceedings have been published by Springer Nature.

The "Qian Weichang Chinese Information Processing Science and Technology Award" is the highest award in the field of Chinese information processing, and is sponsored by the Chinese Information Processing Society of China. The award is reviewed and presented every two years. The number of first prize winners shall not exceed 15, and the number of second prize winners shall not exceed 10.

== Membership ==
CIPS implements a membership system including individual members and unit (or institution) members. Any person or unit engaged in professional work in Chinese information and related fields can apply to become a CIPS member.
