= Wubi =

Wubi, WUBI or wubi may refer to:

- Wubi method, a Chinese character input method
  - Wubi 86, a version of Wubi method
- Wubi (software) (Windows-based Ubuntu Installer), an installer for the Ubuntu operating system
- WSCG (TV), a television station in Georgia, USA, originally called WUBI
