= Dysgraphia =

Neurological disorder of written expression

- Other names: Disorder of written expression
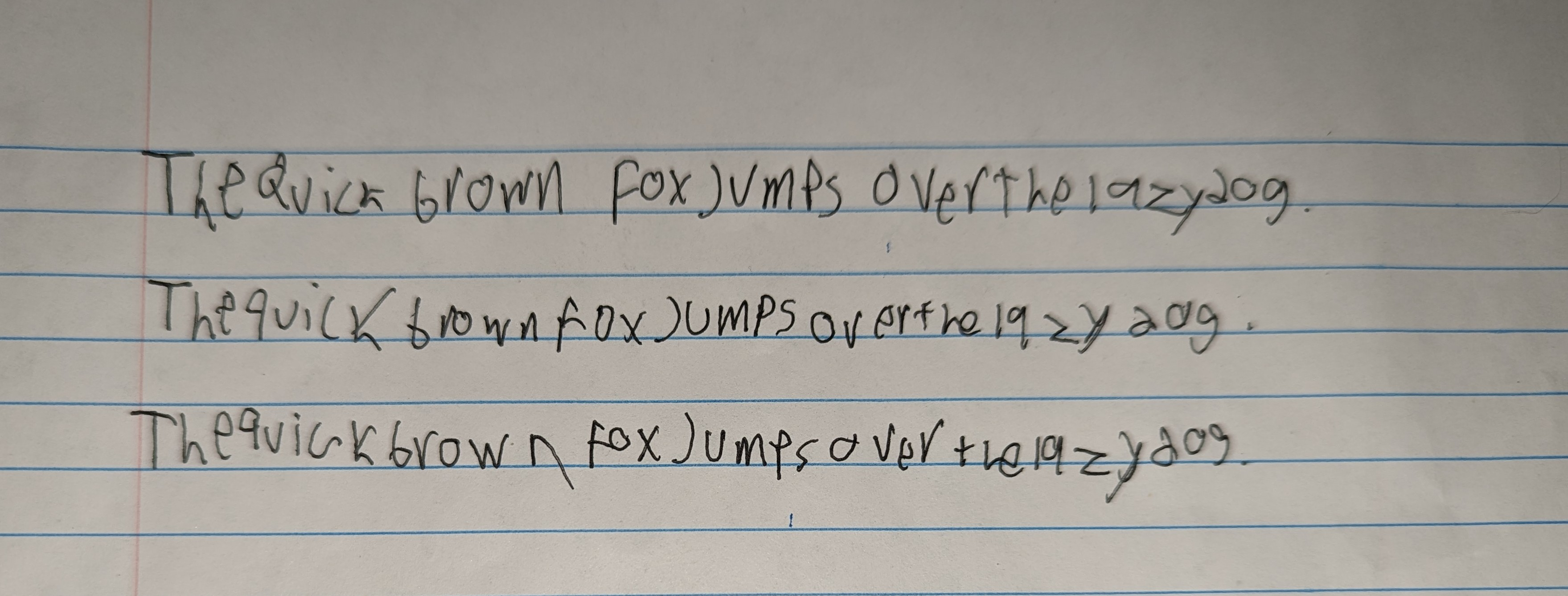
- Three handwritten repetitions of the phrase "The quick brown fox jumps over the lazy dog" on lined paper. The writing, by an adult with dysgraphia, exhibits variations in letter formation, inconsistent spacing, and irregular alignment, all key characteristics of the condition.
- Specialty: Neurology, pediatrics
- Symptoms: Poor and inconsistent handwriting; poor spelling and spacing; other transcription difficulties in absence of oral language difficulties
- Usual onset: Early school age
- Duration: Lifelong
- Types: Linguistic dysgraphia, motor dysgraphia, spatial dysgraphia
- Causes: Genetic and neurological factors
- Risk factors: Family history, co-occurring developmental disabilities
- Differential diagnosis: Dyslexia, written language learning disability

Dysgraphia is a neurological disorder and learning disability that concerns impairments in written expression, which affects the ability to write, primarily handwriting, but also coherence. It is a specific learning disability (SLD) as well as a transcription disability, meaning that it is a writing disorder associated with impaired handwriting, orthographic coding and finger sequencing (the movement of muscles required to write). It often overlaps with other learning disabilities and neurodevelopmental disorders such as speech impairment, attention deficit hyperactivity disorder (ADHD) or developmental coordination disorder (DCD).

Dysgraphia should be distinguished from agraphia (sometimes called acquired dysgraphia), which is an acquired loss of the ability to write resulting from brain injury, progressive illness, or a stroke.

== Etymology ==
The word dysgraphia comes from the Greek words dys meaning "impaired" and γραφία graphía meaning "writing by hand".

== Development ==
There are at least two stages in the act of writing: the linguistic stage and the motor-expressive-praxic stage. The linguistic stage involves the encoding of auditory and visual information into symbols for letters and written words. This is mediated through the angular gyrus, which provides the linguistic rules which guide writing. The motor stage is where the finger movements to write words or graphemes are articulated. This stage is mediated by Exner's writing area of the frontal lobe.

The condition can cause individuals to struggle with feedback and anticipating and exercising control over rhythm and timing throughout the writing process.

People with dysgraphia often write on some level and may experience difficulty with other activities requiring reciprocal movement of their fingers and other fine motor skills, such as; tying shoes, fastening buttons or playing certain musical instruments. However, dysgraphia does not affect all fine motor skills. People with dysgraphia often have unusual difficulty with handwriting and spelling, which in turn can cause writing fatigue. Unlike people without transcription disabilities, they tend to fail to preserve the size and shape of the letters they produce if they cannot look at what they are writing. They may lack basic grammar and spelling skills (for example, having difficulties with the letters p, q, b, and d), and often will write the wrong word when trying to formulate their thoughts on paper. The disorder generally emerges when the child is first introduced to writing. There is accumulating evidence that, in many cases, individuals with SLDs and DCD do not outgrow their disorders. Accordingly, it has been found that adults, teenagers, and children alike are all subject to dysgraphia. Studies have shown that higher education students with developmental dysgraphia still experience significant difficulty with hand writing, fine motor skills and motor-related daily functions when compared to their peers without neurodevelopmental disorders.

== Classification ==
Dysgraphia is nearly always accompanied by other learning disabilities and/or neurodevelopmental disorders such as dyslexia, attention deficit hyperactivity disorder, or oral and written language learning disability (OWL LD) and this can impact the type of dysgraphia a person has. Tourette syndrome, ASD and dyspraxia are also common diagnoses among dysgraphic individuals. Developmental dysgraphia was originally described as being a disorder that occurs solely in dyslexic individuals. Dysgraphia was not studied as a separate entity until mid-20th century when researchers discovered there were different types that occur without dyslexia. Dyslexics and dysgraphics experience similar synchronization difficulties and issues with spelling. However, dyslexia does not seem to impair physical writing ability or dramatically impact fine motor skills and dysgraphia does not impact reading comprehension. Methods for evaluating, managing and remedying dysgraphia are still evolving, but there are three principal subtypes of dysgraphia that are recognized.

=== Dyslexic ===
There are several features that distinguish dyslexic-dysgraphia (sometimes called linguistic dysgraphia) from the other types. People with dyslexic-dysgraphia typically have poor oral and written spelling that is typically phonemic in nature. Their spontaneously written work is often illegible, has extra or deleted syllables or letters, and contains unnecessary capitalization or large spaces in the middle of words which can make each individual word unrecognizable. They may also insert symbols that do not resemble any letter of the alphabet. Writing production generally requires long periods of contemplation and correction.

Dyslexic-dysgraphic individuals have fairly good copied work, and their ability to draw is also preserved. Their finger tapping speed (a method for identifying fine motor problems) is normal, indicating that the deficit does not likely stem from cerebellar damage. Impaired verbal executive functioning has also been related to this form of the disorder.

One study found that boys with ADHD and dysgraphia struggle primarily with motor planning rather than have a linguistic impairment but the prevalence of linguistic/dyslexic-dysgraphia compared to other subtypes is uncertain.

=== Motor ===
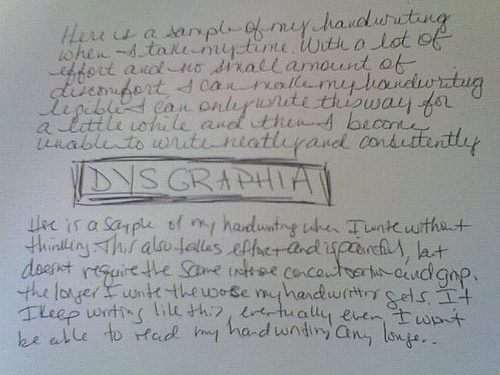
Dysgraphia can be difficult to diagnose because the handwriting starts out clear and slowly degrades, making the writer falsely appear lazy.

Motor dysgraphia (sometimes called peripheral dysgraphia) is due to deficient fine motor skills, poor dexterity, poor muscle tone or unspecified motor clumsiness. Motor dysgraphia impairs both motor patterns and motor memory. Letter formation may be acceptable in very short samples of writing, but this requires extreme effort and an unreasonable amount of time to accomplish, and it cannot be sustained for a significant length of time, as it can cause arthritis-like tensing of the hand. Overall, their written work is poor to illegible even if copied by sight from another document, and drawing is impaired. Oral spelling for these individuals is normal, and their finger tapping speed is below normal. This shows that there are problems within the fine motor skills of these individuals. People with developmental coordination disorder may be dysgraphic and motor-dysgraphia may serve as a marker of dyspraxia. Motor-dysgraphics struggle with proper finger grip and writing is often slanted due to holding a pen or pencil incorrectly. Average writing speed is slower than that of non-dysgrapic individuals, but this seems to improve with age. Motor skill deficits appears to be a common cause of dysgraphia; a study using digital tablets to measure various components of dysgraphic children's writing found that 78% of children with the disorder present kinematic difficulties, while 58% of them display issues with exerting pressure.

=== Spatial ===
A person with spatial dysgraphia has an impairment in the understanding of space. This impaired spatial perception causes illegible spontaneously written work, illegible copied work, abnormal spacing between letters and majorly impaired drawing abilities. They have normal oral spelling and normal finger tapping speed, suggesting that this subtype is not fine motor based.

=== Dyscravia ===
In 2010, the Dyscravia or voicing substitution dysgraphia subtype was proposed. The subtype presents with differentiated voicing substitution, where individuals make mistakes when transferring from phonemes to graphemes (ie. "goat" would be mistakenly written as "coat"). Dyscravia does not appear to result from impairments in auditory processing or in speech production. It can occur with a completely intact graphemic buffer, phonological output lexicon, phonological output buffer, and allographic stage – the function that processes the voicing feature for writing may be selectively impaired without deficits in other functions of the conversion route. Dyscravia may or may not be accompanied by a parallel reading disability.

In a 2012 study 19 of 90 patients, with primary progressive aphasia were found to meet diagnostic criteria for dyscravia, which is percentage-wise higher than in a normative population; 20% where as in a general population it is estimated at about 10%.

=== Miscellaneous ===
Other subtypes and informal classification systems have been proposed by researchers; this includes but is not limited to phonological dysgraphia, deep dysgraphia and surface dysgraphia.

== Signs and symptoms ==
The symptoms to dysgraphia are often overlooked or attributed to the student being lazy, unmotivated, careless or anxious. The condition may also be dismissed as simply being an expression of attention deficiency or having delayed visual-motor processing. In order to be diagnosed with dysgraphia, one must have a cluster, but not necessarily all, of the following symptoms:

- Poor legibility
- Excessive erasures
- Misuse of lines and margins
- Poor spatial planning on paper
- Relies heavily on vision to write
- Irregular letter sizes and shapes
- Frequent reliance on verbal cues
- Inattentiveness over details when writing
- Mixed upper case and lower case letters
- Switching between cursive and print letters
- Difficulty visualizing letter formation beforehand
- Slow writing speed or inefficient speed of copying
- Inconsistent form and size of letters, or unfinished letters
- Difficulty understanding homophones and what spelling to use
- Handwriting abilities that interfere with spelling and written composition
- Struggles with translating ideas to writing, sometimes using the wrong words altogether
- Issues following rules of sentence structure or grammar when writing, but not when speaking
- Feeling pain while writing (eg; cramps in fingers, wrist and palms)
- Odd wrist, arm, body, or paper orientations (eg; bending arm into an L shape, holding paper down with non-dominant hand)
- Synchronization difficulties like writing and thinking at the same time (eg; creative writing, taking notes, tapping and judging line orientation concurrently)
- Slow development of essential skills such as shoe tying

The symptoms of dysgraphia can change as one ages. Dysgraphia may cause students distress often due to the fact that no one can read their writing, and they are aware that they are not performing to the same level as their peers. Emotional problems that may occur alongside dysgraphia include impaired self-esteem, lowered self-efficacy, reduced motivation, poorer social functioning, heightened anxiety, and depression. They may put in extra efforts in order to have the same achievements as their peers, but often get frustrated because they feel that their hard work does not pay off. Dysgraphia is a hard disorder to detect as it does not affect specific ages, gender, or intelligence. The main concern in trying to detect dysgraphia is that people hide their disability behind their verbal fluency/comprehension and strong syntax coding as a means to mask the handwriting impairments caused by the disorder. Having dysgraphia is not related to a lack of cognitive ability, and it is not uncommon in intellectually gifted individuals, but due to dysgraphia their intellectual abilities are often not identified.

=== Associated conditions ===
There are some common problems not related to dysgraphia but often associated with dysgraphia, the most common of which is stress. Developing an aversion to writing is another common issue. Often children (and adults) with dysgraphia will become extremely frustrated with the task of writing especially on plain paper (and spelling); younger children may cry, pout, or refuse to complete written assignments. This frustration can cause the individuals a great deal of stress and can lead to stress-related illnesses. This can be a result of any symptom of dysgraphia.

== Causes ==
The underlying causes of the disorder are not fully understood, but dysgraphia is known to have genetic causes. More specifically, it is a working memory problem caused by specific neurodevelopmental dysfunction. In dysgraphia, individuals fail to develop normal connections among different brain regions needed for writing. People with dysgraphia have difficulty in automatically remembering and mastering the sequence of motor movements required to write letters or numbers. Dysgraphia is also in part due to underlying problems in orthographic coding, the orthographic loop, and graphomotor output (the movements that result in writing) by one's hands, fingers and executive functions involved in letter writing. The orthographic loop is when written words are stored in the mind's eye, connected through sequential finger movement for motor output through the hand with feedback from the eye.

Family history of specific learning disabilities may play a role. Children with developmental dysphasia, developmental dysgraphia and developmental dyslexia may be more likely to have family members with one of these conditions. Genetic studies suggest that verbal executive function tasks, orthographic skills, and spelling ability may have a genetic basis. Genes on chromosomes 6 and 15 may play some role with SLDs as they have linked to poorer reading, poorer spelling and lower phonemic awareness.

== Diagnosis ==
Unlike specific learning disabilities and neurodevelopmental disorders that have been more extensively studied, there is no gold standard for diagnosing dysgraphia. This is likely due to writing systems often differing substantially between countries and languages and there being considerable heterogeneity among medical professionals who are charged with diagnosing dysgraphia. Consequently, there are several tests that are used to diagnose dysgraphia like Ajuriaguerra scale, BHK for children or teenagers, the Minnesota Handwriting Assessment, ETCH, SCRIPT, DASH and HHE scale.

With devices like drawing tablets, it is now possible to measure the position, tilt, and pressure in real time. From these features, it is possible to compute automatic features like speed and shaking and train a classifier to diagnose automatically children with atypical writing. The features extracted have different importances in the classification through development and allow to characterize different subtypes of dysgraphia that could have different origins, outcomes and could require different remediation strategies.

It is not uncommon for dysgraphic individuals to be intellectually gifted, possess a rich vocabulary and have strong comprehension of language when speaking or reading, though their disorder is often not detected or treated; which may also be in part to developmental dyslexia receiving far more academic and medical attention than developmental dysgraphia. In addition, gifted children with transcription disabilities seldom receive programming for their intellectual talents due to their difficulties in completing written assignments.

== Treatment ==
Treatment for dysgraphia varies and may include treatment for motor disorders to help control writing movements. Helping dysgraphic students overcome writing avoidance and accept the purpose and necessity of writing may be needed. The use of occupational therapy can be effective in the school setting, and teachers should be well informed about dysgraphia to aid in carry-over of the occupational therapist's interventions. One common form of therapy is the use of Thera-putty, which helps develop dexterity. Treatments may address impaired memory or other neurological problems. Some physicians recommend that individuals with dysgraphia use computers to avoid the problems of handwriting. Speech-to-text programs have also been suggested as a potential treatment for dysgraphia. Speech-recognition technologies are used in two ways: dictation and computer control. As a dictation tool, spoken words are translated into written text; the student speaks the words into a microphone and the words are typed. The computer-control tool allows students to control the computer and software applications by speaking commands. If students are going to use speech-recognition software, they need to use consistent, clear speech. The use of computers also allows patients to experiment with different ergonomic keyboards. Today, there are many alternative keyboards for consideration. There are keyboards with enlarged and/or alphabetically arranged letters; there are keyboards that are ergonomically designed; and there are mini keyboards for students who have a limited range of motion. Dysgraphia can sometimes be partially overcome with appropriate and conscious effort and training.

== Prevalence ==
It has been estimated that up to 10% of children in the world are affected by disabilities like dysgraphia, dyslexia, dyscalculia and dyspraxia.

== School ==
There is no special education category for students with dysgraphia; in the United States, The National Center for Learning Disabilities suggests that children with dysgraphia be handled in a case-by-case manner with an Individualized Education Program, or provided individual accommodation to provide alternative ways of submitting work and modify tasks to avoid the area of weakness. (It can often be difficult for students to have general accommodations for any student that might have dysgraphia as "Careful planning should precede all technology purchases, as many technologies are costly and school budgets are limited. In considering adoption of any of the technology recommended") Students with dysgraphia often cannot complete written assignments that are legible, appropriate in length and content, or within given time. It is suggested that students with dysgraphia receive specialized instructions that are appropriate for them. Children will mostly benefit from explicit and comprehensive instructions, help translating across multiple levels of language, and review and revision of assignments or writing methods. Direct, explicit instruction on letter formation and guided practice will help students achieve automatic handwriting performance before they use letters to write words, phrases, and sentences. Some older children may benefit from the use of a personal computer or a laptop in class so that they do not have to deal with the frustration of falling behind their peers. Predictive text technology has been suggested as something that could greatly help students with dysgraphia.

It is also suggested by Berninger that teachers with dysgraphic students decide if their focus will be on manuscript writing (printing) or keyboarding. In either case, it is beneficial that students are taught how to read cursive writing as it is used daily in classrooms by some teachers. It may also be beneficial for the teacher to come up with other methods of assessing a child's knowledge other than written tests; an example would be oral testing. This causes less frustration for the child as they are able to get their knowledge across to the teacher without worrying about how to write their thoughts. Dysgraphic students may benefit from special accommodation by their teachers when being required to write. Accommodations that may be helpful include but are not limited to; offering larger pencils or pencils with special grips, supplying paper with raised lines to provide tactile feedback, allowing extra time for classwork assignments, scaling down large written assignments and breaking down long written assignments into multiple shorter assignments.

The number of students with dysgraphia may increase from 4 percent of students in primary grades, due to the overall difficulty of handwriting, and up to 20 percent in middle school because written compositions become more complex. With this in mind, there are no exact numbers of how many individuals have dysgraphia due to its difficulty to diagnose and exact prevalence depends on the definition of dysgraphia. There are slight gender differences in association with written disabilities; overall it is found that males are more likely to be impaired with handwriting, composing, spelling, and orthographic abilities than females.

The Diagnostic and Statistical Manual of Mental Disorders-5 (DSM-5) does not use the term dysgraphia but uses the phrase "an impairment in written expression" under the category of "specific learning disorder". This is the term used by most doctors and psychologists. To qualify for special education services, a child must have an issue named or described in the Individuals with Disabilities Education Act (IDEA). While IDEA does not use the term "dysgraphia", it describes it under the category of "specific learning disability". This includes issues with understanding or using language (spoken or written) that make it difficult to listen, think, speak, read, write, spell or to do mathematical calculations.

== See also ==
- Agraphia
- Character amnesia
- Developmental disability
- Learning disability
- Lists of language disorders
