= Wang Yongmin =

Chinese programmer (born 1943)

- Chinese: 王永民
Transcriptions
Standard Mandarin
- Hanyu Pinyin: Wáng Yǒngmín
- Wade–Giles: Wang Yung-min
- IPA: [wǎŋjʊ̀ŋmǐn] [wɑ̌ŋ jʊ̀ŋmǐn]
Yue: Cantonese
- Jyutping: Wong4 Wing5man4
Southern Min
- Hokkien POJ: Ông Éng-bîn

Wang Yongmin (Chinese: 王永民; pinyin: Wáng Yǒngmín; born December 15, 1943) is a Chinese programmer, who developed Wubi, a very fast input method for entering Chinese characters using a standard Latin keyboard. Currently he is the president of Wangma, a Beijing-based software development company.

== Wang's life ==
Wang Yongmin was born in 1943, in Nanyang, Henan province, China. In 1968, he graduated from USTC, but soon after that he was sentenced to farm labour in the programme of "labour re-education" during the Chinese Cultural revolution.

In 1978, he undertook research on a system for decomposing Chinese characters into their constituent parts with minimal ambiguity. This research ultimately resulted in Wubi, an input method patented in China and internationally. Other structural methods, which first appeared around the same time, assumed a one-to-one mapping between components of Chinese characters and Latin keys (for example, Cangjie). Instead, Wang Yongmin assigned several character components to each key relying on the inherent redundancy of Chinese characters. For example, the U key can generate 13 different shapes (such as 立, 六, 辛 or 冫), but a sequence of at most four keys always disambiguates individual shapes, for example, pressing UEMC produces 毅, mapping U to 立 for this character.

The first PC version of Wubi appeared in 1984, and soon became the most popular method of entering Chinese characters in the PRC, becoming known as "China's first software" (中国第一软件).

In 1989, Wang Yongmin established his own company Wangma (lit. Wang Code).

In 1988, he received the title of National Model Worker (全国劳动模范).

== Intellectual property dispute ==
Wubi was also a party to the first legal case in China concerning intellectual property rights. The third version of Wubi was protected by a Chinese patent in 1986. The majority of computer vendors in the PRC in the early 1990s were selling computers with Wubi preinstalled without paying royalties to Wangma. In April 1992, Wang Yongmin brought a lawsuit against Dongnan, a company producing Hanka, a clone of Wubi (with an adapted interface and key memorisation). In December 1993, Beijing Intermediate People's Court (北京市中级法院) ordered Dongnan to pay Wangma 240 thousand yuan for breach of its intellectual property rights. However, a new dispute brought by Lenovo in 1994 led to a decision by the Beijing High Court (北京市高级法院) to treat Wubi as "public knowledge" citing decomposition of Chinese characters by five basic strokes as going back millennia.

== See also ==
Input method
