= Institute of Software =

Chinese research institute

- Institute of Software; Chinese Academy of Sciences
- 中国科学院软件研究所
- Abbreviation: ISCAS
- Formation: March 1, 1985; 41 years ago
- Founder: Chinese Academy of Sciences
- Type: Research institute
- Legal status: Governmental organization
- Purpose: Software research
- Headquarters: 4th Zhongguancun South Fourth Street, Haidian District
- Locations: Beijing, Chongqing, Guangzhou, Guiyang, Harbin, Qingdao, Wuxi
- Coordinates: 39.97999°N 116.33574°E
- Region served: China
- Fields: Computer science, software engineering
- Official language: Chinese, English
- Owner: Chinese Government
- Director: Zhao Chen
- Publication: Journal of Software, Journal of Chinese Information Processing, Computer Systems Applications
- Parent organization: Chinese Academy of Sciences
- Subsidiaries: State Key Laboratory of Computer Science, National Engineering Research Center of Fundamental Software, Science and Technology on Integrated Information System Laboratory
- Funding: Chinese Academy of Sciences
- Staff: 1,390 (2024)
- Students: 387 graduate students, 279 enrolled PhD candidates (2024)
- Website: english.is.cas.cn

The Institute of Software (ISCAS, in Chinese: 中国科学院软件研究所) is a research institute under the Chinese Academy of Sciences.

The institute was established on March 1, 1985. It is located on 4th Zhongguancun South Fourth Street, Haidian District, Beijing, China. There are branches in Wuxi, Chongqing, Harbin, Guangzhou, Qingdao, and Guiyang. Its research areas are computer science theory and application, fundamental software technology and system structure, the Internet information processing theory, methods and technology, as well as the integrated information system technology. There are five departments in the institute:

- General Division
- Basic Research Division
- Hi-Tech Research Division
- Applied Research Division
- Development Division

There are also state key laboratories and national engineering research centers:

- State Key Laboratory of Computer Science
- National Engineering Research Center of Fundamental Software
- Science and Technology on Integrated Information System Laboratory

Software-related academic journals hosted by ISCAS are:

- Journal of Software
- Journal of Chinese Information Processing
- Computer Systems Applications.

== See also ==
- China Software Industry Association
- Software industry in China
