= Dayi method =

Chinese character input method based on components

Coding of "大易輸入法" using the Dayi method

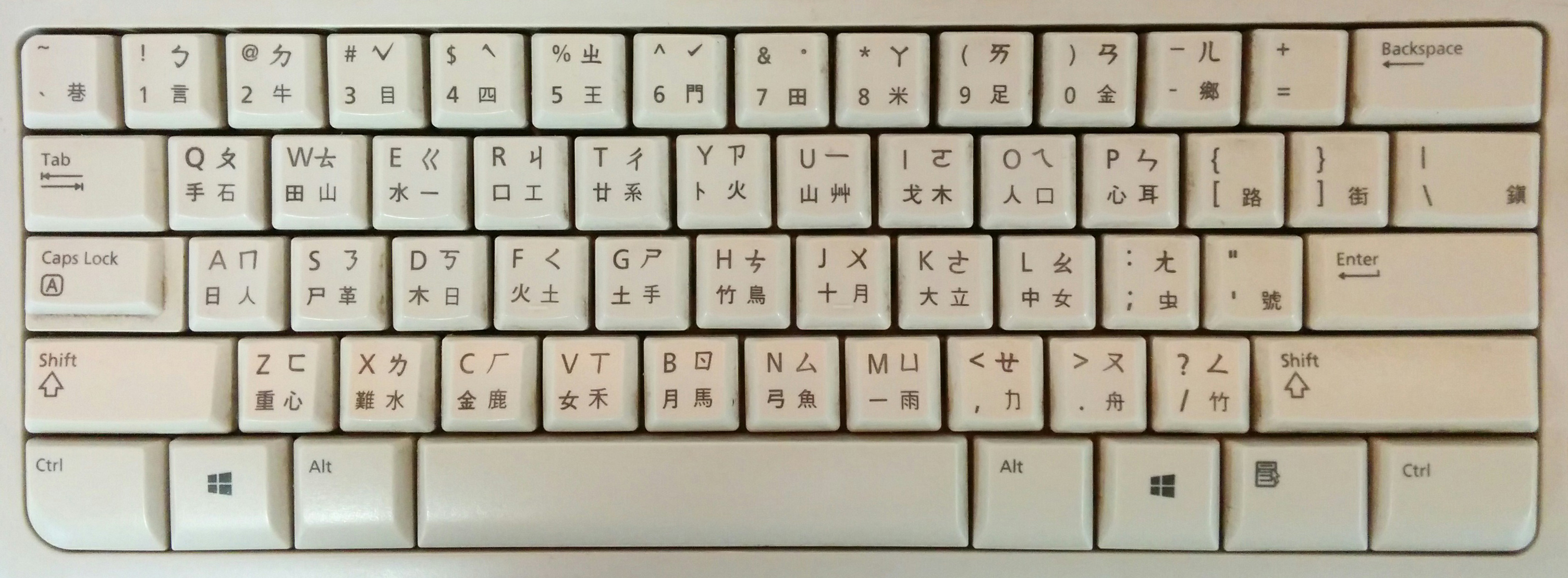
A Chinese keyboard with Dayi hints printed on the lower-right corners of the keys. (Printed on the lower-left and upper-right corners are Cangjie hints and Bopomofo symbols respectively.)

Dayi (Chinese: 大易; pinyin: dàyì, literally "great ease") is a system for entering Chinese characters on a standard QWERTY keyboard using a set of 46 character components. A character is built by combining up to four of the 46 characters (the other six are provided for typing Taiwanese addresses), using a system similar to that of Cangjie, but is decomposed in stroke order instead of in geometric shape in Cangjie.

On most keyboards in Taiwan, most keys show four symbols. On the keys, the Latin letters are in the upper left, Bopomofo symbols on the upper right, Cangjie symbols on the lower left, and Dayi symbols on the lower right.

== Layout ==
Like Cangjie, every radical has some auxiliary shapes; but some of the auxiliary shapes of one radical originate from the mnemonic word of the radical. For example, key 6 is mapped to 車(car) in the keyboard, its mnemonic word is "6片車門"(six pieces of car door), and its auxiliary shapes include "片"(piece), "爿"(old character for "wall", its shape is the reflection of "片"), "甫"(its shape is like "車"), "門"(door), "鬥"(to battle or to fight, its shape is like "門").

A QWERTY keyboard layout for the Dayi input method (annotated with hints and related/auxiliary radicals)

A typical keyboard layout for Dayi method

== Methodology ==
The following are rules of the Dayi input method:

1. Input is with accordance to Chinese writing stroke order: "top first, then bottom", "left first, then right".
2. For characters made of more than 4 symbols, enter the first three and the last symbol.
  For instance, "壽" (士乛工口手舟) is represented by just 4 symbols: 士乛工舟 (FBR.).
3. For symmetrical characters, enter the center followed by either side.
  For instance, "巫" is represented by 工人人 (RAA).
4. "臼" (W) is the wildcard key for the top part of words regardless of the contents:
  Examples:
  兒 = 臼儿 (WQ)
  與 = 臼一八 (WE8)
  覺 = 臼冖目儿 (WM3Q)

== Sample Learning Technique ==
One common frustration of learning any Chinese input method is not knowing the correct sequence of keys to enter. This problem can be alleviated with the help of an answer table. The following technique can be used to familiarize oneself with the Dayi keyboard layout. Speed and proficiency will develop with additional practice. This technique can be used with other input methods as well using similar lookup tables as answers.

- Find a source of commonly used Chinese vocabulary to type. This can may be found on the Internet by usage frequency or HSK level. For Dayi, use the list of Chinese Traditional words.
  (Also see List of Commonly Used Characters in Modern Chinese)
- Navigate to a lookup table to use as an answer key.
  For Dayi [with 4 keystrokes or less], dayin4.cin is publicly available on the Internet at various open-source repositories (see external links).
- Using the annotated image of the Dayi keyboard layout, look for the radicals that make up the character.
  Enter them according to the methodology.
- If the character is not successfully entered, search the answer table for the desired sequence of keystrokes.
  Try to understand why those keystrokes are used.
  Note that there may be more than one answer for conciseness.
  醫 = 匚牛大酉 (R2V8),
  It can be condensed into 匚酉 (R8) since it does not conflict with other words in the dictionary.
- Repeat with roughly 150 words in the word list.
- Repeat with roughly the next 150 word in the word list.
  If possible, this time avoid turning to the annotated layout of the Dayi keyboard.
- After successful practice, about 300 items have been entered.
  The locations of many common radicals (such as 日一言木土) would be quite familiar.

== Comparison with other Chinese input methods ==
The keyboard layout for the Dayi input method contains keys for many of the Kangxi radicals in its entirety. This means that a single keystroke accounts for the left half or right half of many Chinese characters. For instance, "車" in "輸" (6AJN) is represented by "6". This allows for characters to be represented by 4 keys or less. In comparison, in Cangjie, "車" in "輸" (JJOMN) is represented by "JJ" for "十十", thus requiring up to 5 keys per Chinese character. A user of Cangjie would require experience and attention to decomposition rules to notice that the "田" segments of the Kangxi radical are omitted.

Unlike other input methods, Dayi's use of 46 character components instead of 26 happens to be its greatest impediment, because it makes typing digits and punctuation marks very inconvenient.

== Some supported operating systems ==
Some operating systems that support the Dayi input method are:

- Microsoft Windows 8/10
- Microsoft Windows 95/XP
- Linux (via ibus-tables or similar)
- Apple Macintosh (via openvanilla or similar)

== See also ==
- Chinese input methods for computers
- Keyboard layout
- List of Commonly Used Characters in Modern Chinese
- Cangjie input method
