= Chinese input method =

Several input methods allow the use of Chinese characters with computers. Most allow selection of characters based either on their pronunciation or their graphical shape. Phonetic input methods are easier to learn but are less efficient, while graphical methods allow faster input, but have a steep learning curve.

Other methods allow users to write characters directly via touchscreens, such as those found on mobile phones and tablet computers.

== History ==
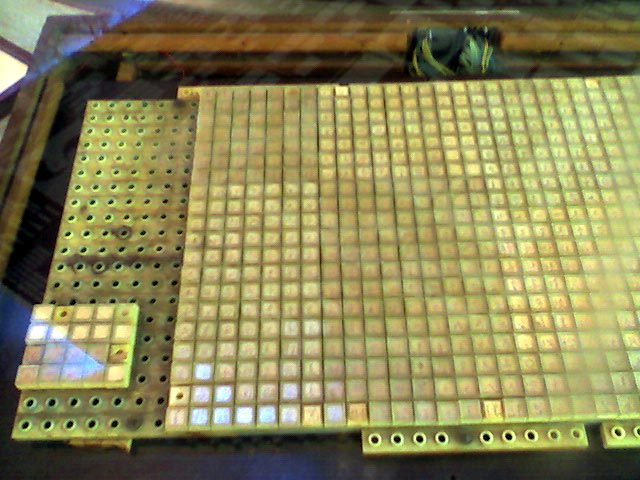
An early experimental Chinese radical keyboard using 496 keys for input was developed by researchers of National Chiao Tung University in Taiwan, but was never widely used.

Chinese input methods predate the computer. One of the early attempts was an electro-mechanical Chinese typewriter Mingkwai (Chinese: 明快; pinyin: míngkuài; Wade–Giles: ming-k'uai) which was invented by Lin Yutang, a prominent Chinese writer, in the 1940s. It assigned thirty base shapes or strokes to different keys and adopted a new way of categorizing Chinese characters. But the typewriter was not produced commercially and Lin soon found himself deeply in debt.

Before the 1980s, Chinese publishers hired teams of workers and selected a few thousand type pieces from an enormous Chinese character set. Chinese government agencies entered characters using a long, complicated list of Chinese telegraph codes, which assigned different numbers to each character. During the early computer era, Chinese characters were categorized by their radicals or Pinyin romanization, but results were less than satisfactory.

In the 1970s to 1980s, large keyboards with thousands of keys were used to input Chinese. Each key was mapped to several Chinese characters. To type a character, one pressed the character key and then a selection key. There were also experimental "radical keyboards" with dozens to several hundreds of keys. Chinese characters were decomposed into "radicals", each of which was represented by a key. Unwieldy and difficult to use, these keyboards became obsolete after the introduction of Cangjie input method, the first method to use only the standard QWERTY keyboard and make Chinese touch typing possible.

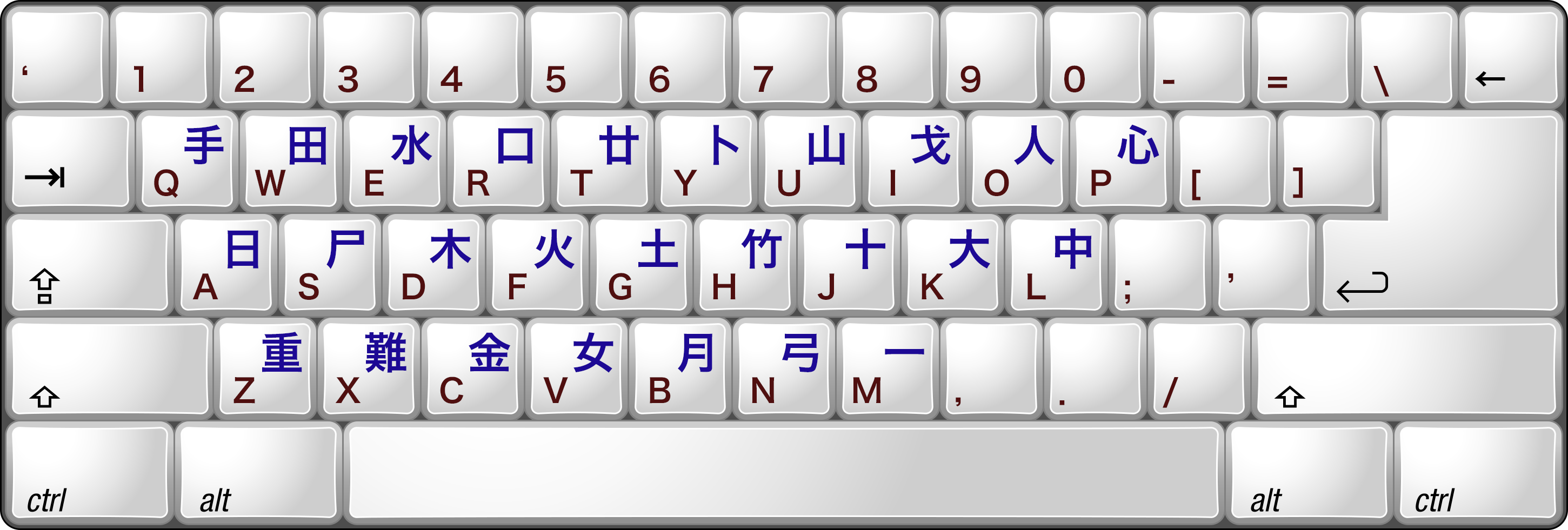
A typical keyboard layout for the Cangjie method, which is based on the United States keyboard layout.

Chu Bong-Foo invented a common input method in 1976 with his Cangjie input method, which assigns different "roots" to each key on a standard computer keyboard. With this method, for example, the character 日 is assigned to the A key, and 月 is assigned to B. Typing them together will result in the character 明 ("bright").

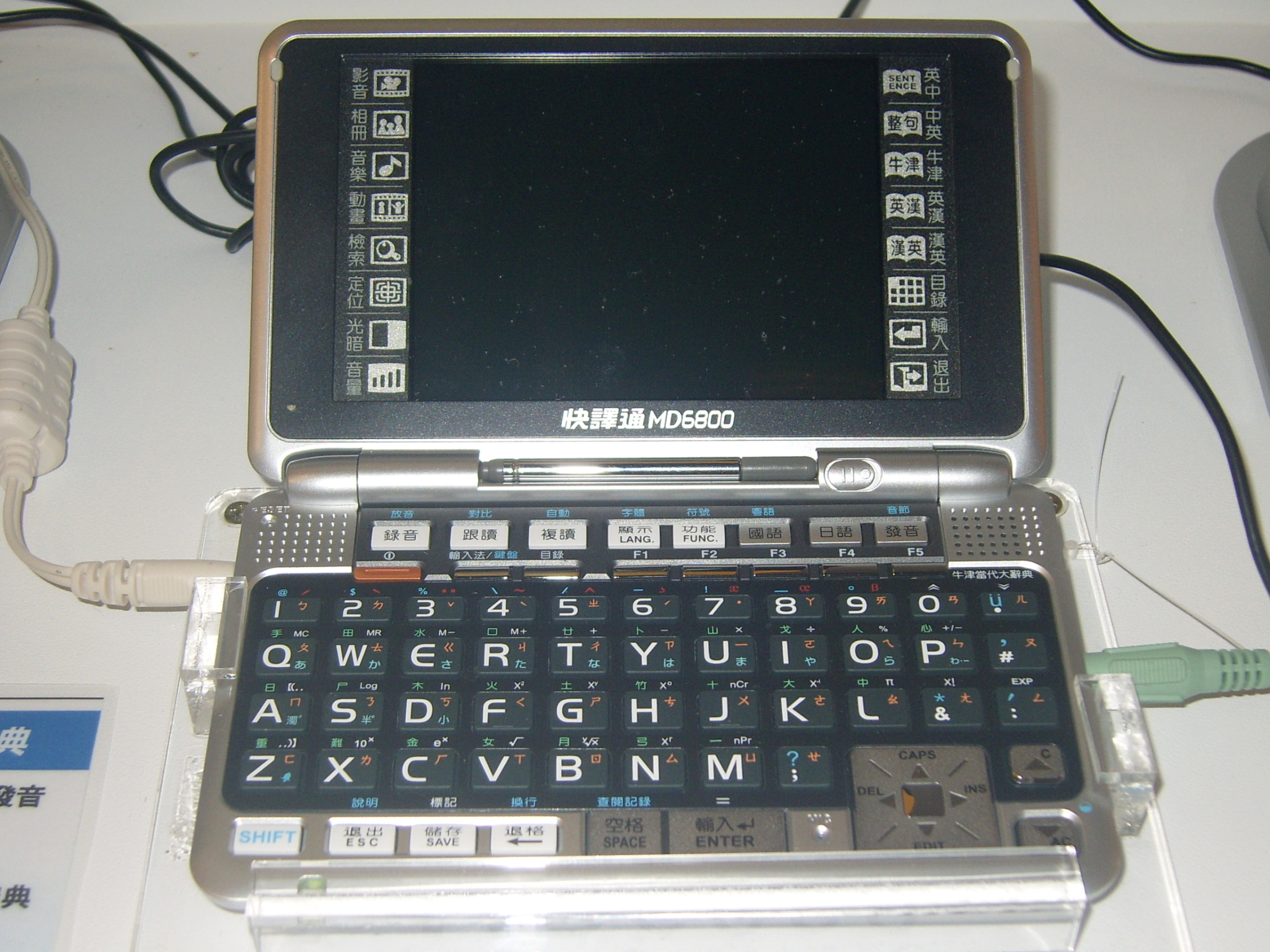
An electronic dictionary with Cangjie and Bopomofo keyboard

Despite its steeper learning curve, this method remains popular in Chinese communities that use traditional Chinese characters, such as Hong Kong and Taiwan; the method allows very precise input, thus allowing users to type more efficiently and quickly, provided they are familiar with the fairly complicated rules of the method. It was the first method that allowed users to enter more than a hundred Chinese characters per minute. Its popularity is also helped by its omnipresence on traditional Chinese computer systems, since Chu gave up his patent in 1982, stating that it should be part of the cultural asset. Developers of Chinese systems can adopt it freely, and users do not have the hassle of it being absent on devices with Chinese support. Cangjie input programs supporting a large CJK character set have been developed.

All methods have their strengths and weaknesses. The pinyin method can be learned rapidly but its maximum input rate is limited. The Wubi method takes longer to learn, but expert typists can enter text much more rapidly with it than with phonetic methods. However, Wubi is proprietary, and a version of it has become freely available only after its inventor lost a patent lawsuit in 1997.

Due to these complexities, there is no "standard" method.

By 1989, bopomofo and pinyin were available for the IBM PC. In mainland China, pinyin methods such as Sogou Pinyin are the most popular. In Taiwan, use of bopomofo input predominates; and in Hong Kong and Macau, the Cangjie is most often taught in schools, while a few schools teach CKC Chinese Input System.

Other methods include handwriting recognition, OCR and speech recognition. The computer itself must first be "trained" before the first or second of these methods are used; that is, the new user enters the system in a special "learning mode" so that the system can learn to identify their handwriting or speech patterns. The latter two methods are used less frequently than keyboard-based input methods and suffer from relatively high error rates, especially when used without proper "training", though higher error rates are an acceptable trade-off to many users.

== Categories ==
=== Phonetic-based ===
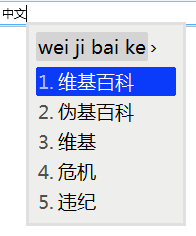
Interface of a Pinyin input method, showcasing the need to choose an appropriate word from a list of options. The typed input, wei ji bai ke, is a syllabic approximation of the Mandarin Chinese word for "Wikipedia". (Note: The displayed options are: 1. 维基百科, Wéijī bǎikē, 'Wikipedia'; 2. 伪基百科, Wěi jī bǎikē, 'Uncyclopedia'; 3. 维基, Wéijī, 'Wiki'; 4. 危机, Wéijī, 'Crisis'; 5. 违纪, Wéijì, 'Break rules/laws')

The user enters pronunciations that are converted into relevant Chinese characters. The user must select the desired character from homophones, which are common in Chinese. Modern systems, such as Sogou Pinyin and Google Pinyin, predict the desired characters based on context and user preferences. For example, if one enters the sounds jicheng, the software will type 繼承 (to inherit), but if jichengche is entered, 計程車 (taxi) will appear.

Various Chinese dialects complicate the system. Phonetic methods are mainly based on standard pinyin, Zhuyin/Bopomofo, and Jyutping in China, Taiwan, and Hong Kong, respectively. Input methods based on other varieties of Chinese, like Hakka or Minnan, also exist.

While the phonetic system is easy to learn, choosing appropriate Chinese characters slows typing speed. Most users report a typing speed of fifty characters per minute, though some reach over one hundred per minute. With some phonetic IMEs (Input Method Editors), in addition to predictive input based on previous conversions, it is possible for users to create custom dictionary entries for frequently used characters and phrases, potentially lowering the number of characters required to evoke it.

==== Shuangpin ====
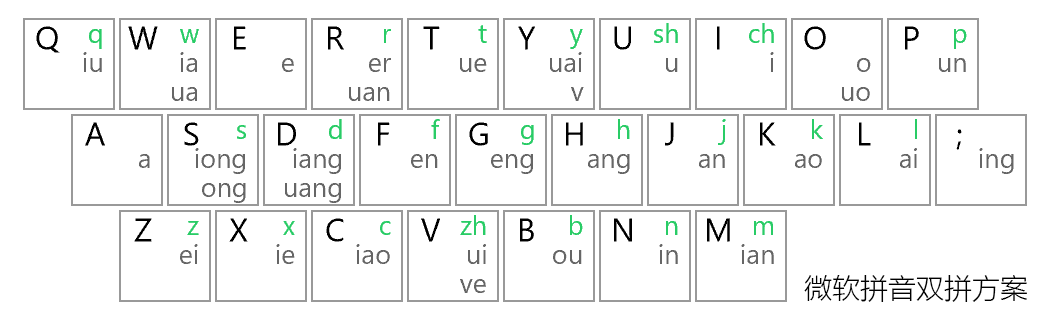
The Microsoft pinyin 2003 shuangpin scheme.

Shuangpin (双拼; 雙拼), literally dual spell, is a stenographical phonetic input method based on hanyu pinyin that reduces the number of keystrokes for one Chinese character to two by distributing every vowel and consonant composed of more than one letter to a specific key. In most Shuangpin layout schemes such as Xiaohe, Microsoft 2003 and Ziranma, the most frequently used vowels are placed on the middle layer, reducing the risk of repetitive strain injury.

Shuangpin is supported by a large number of pinyin input software including QQ, Microsoft Bing Pinyin, Sogou Pinyin and Google Pinyin.

=== Shape-based ===
Typing Chinese with the Cangjie input method

- Cangjie input method
- Simplified Cangjie
- Dayi method
- Array input method (行列)
- Four-corner method
- Stroke count method
- Wubi method
- Zhengma method
- Biaoxingma method
- ZYQ method (正易全)

=== Others ===
- Chinese telegraph code (中文電碼)

=== Examples of keyboard layouts ===
A typical keyboard layout for zhuyin on computers, which can be used as an input method

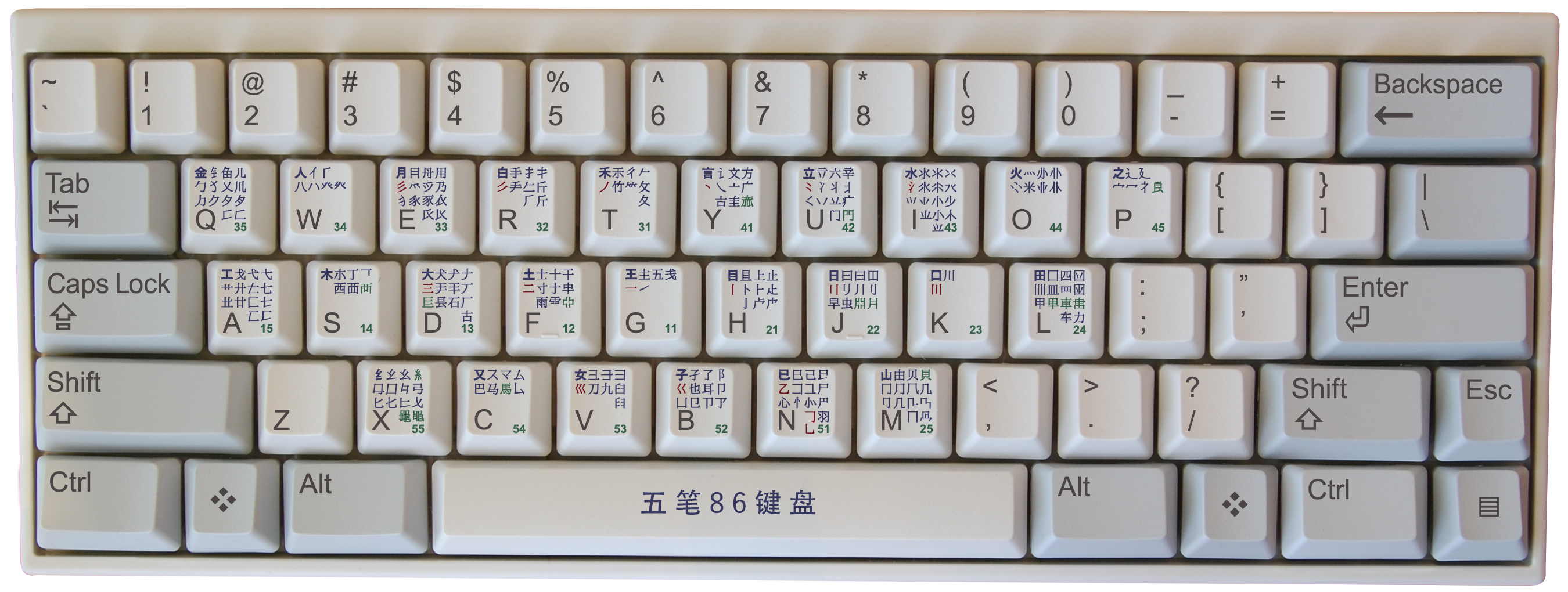
A keyboard using the Wubi method

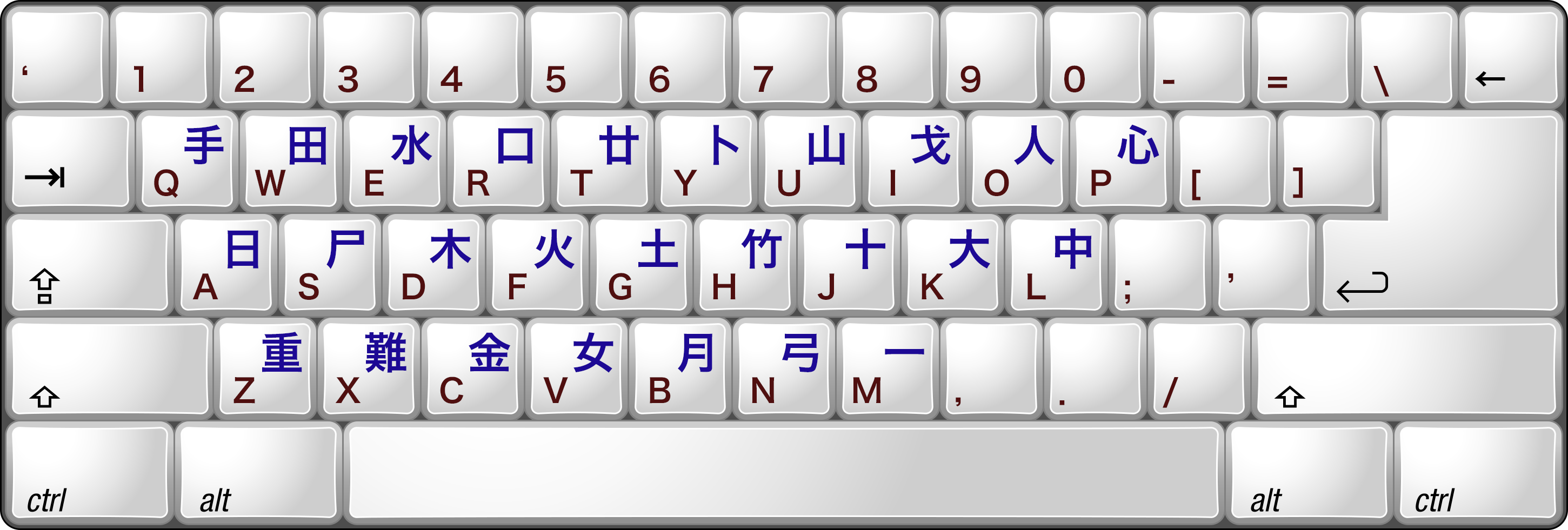
A typical keyboard layout for the Cangjie method, which is based on the U.S. keyboard layout. Note the non-standard use of Z as the collision key.

A typical keyboard layout for the Dayi method

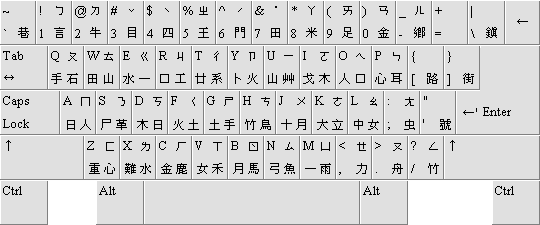
Chinese (traditional) keyboard layout, a US keyboard with Zhuyin, Cangjie and Dayi key labels, which can all be used to input Chinese characters into a computer

== Software ==
- Microsoft IME
- Sogou Pinyin
- Google Pinyin

== See also ==
- List of input methods for Unix platforms
- List of CJK fonts
- Chinese language and computers
- Japanese language and computers
  - Japanese input methods
- Korean language and computers
- Vietnamese language and computers
- Han unification
- Character amnesia
- Chinese character encodings:
  - Big5
  - Guobiao code (GB)
  - Unicode
  - Telegraph code
- Chinese character IT
