= International Conference on Integrated Power Electronics Systems =

The International Conference on Integrated Power Electronics Systems (CIPS) is biennially held in the city of Nuremberg, Germany. The conference has its origin in the Power Electronics Specialists Conference (PESC) and first took place in 2000. Since 2004, conference papers are available through IEEE Xplore. The conference grows continually: in 2014 292 engineers and scientists attended the conference, 24% more than 2012.

CIPS focuses on the following main aspects:

- electronic packaging technologies
- hybrid systems and high Power density integration
- reliability of systems and components
- mechatronic integration
- reduction of parasitic elements in power modules
