= Stroke count method =

Chinese character input method

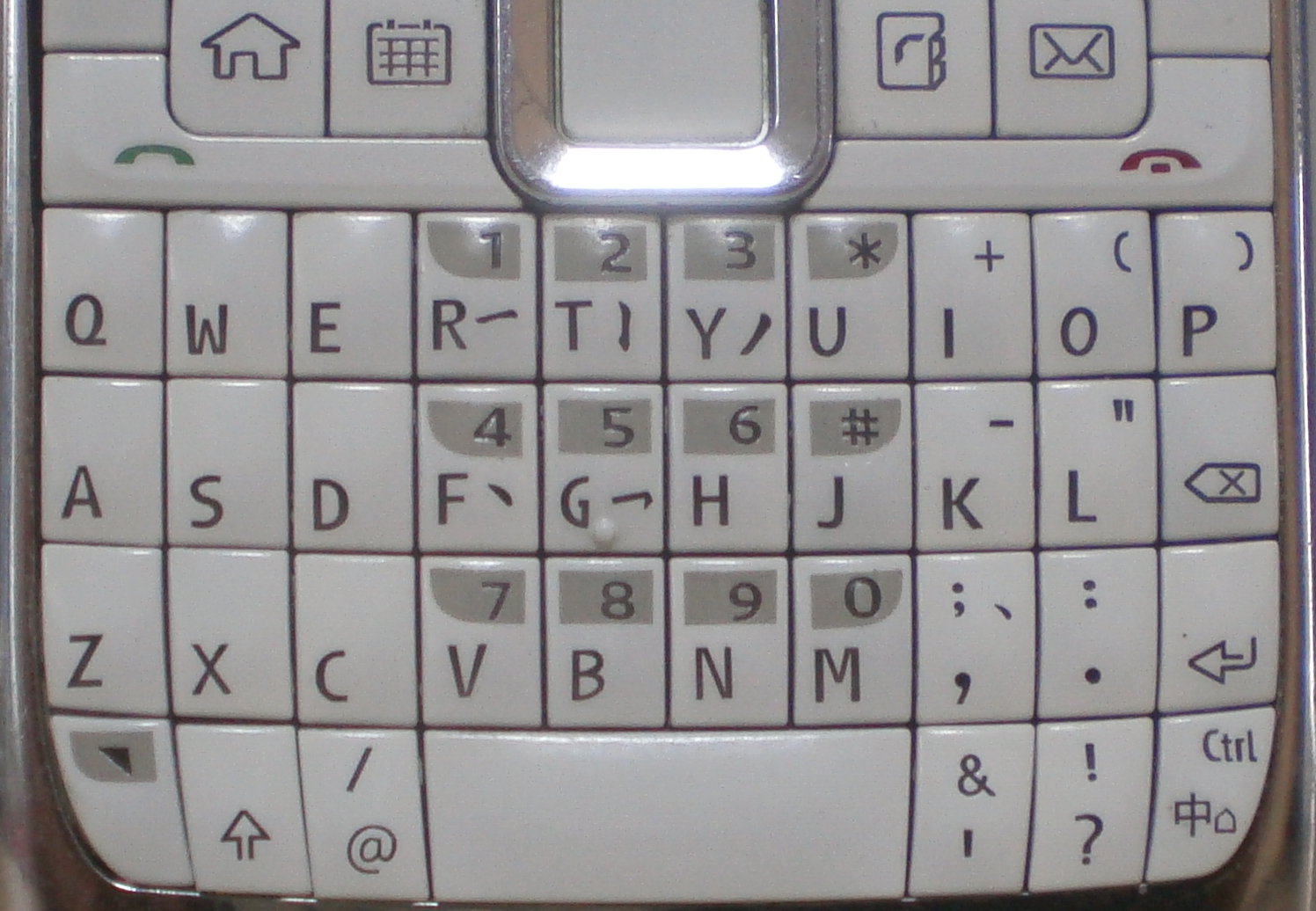
Keyboard of a Chinese mobile phone, showing roles of the numbers 1–5 in the Wubihua method

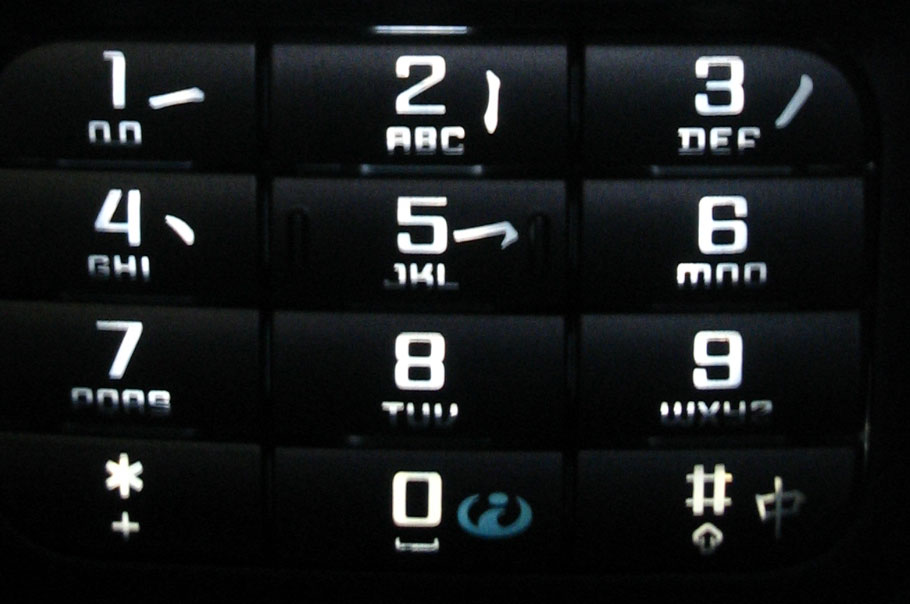
T9 keypad of a Chinese mobile phone, showing roles of the numbers 1–5 in the Wubihua method

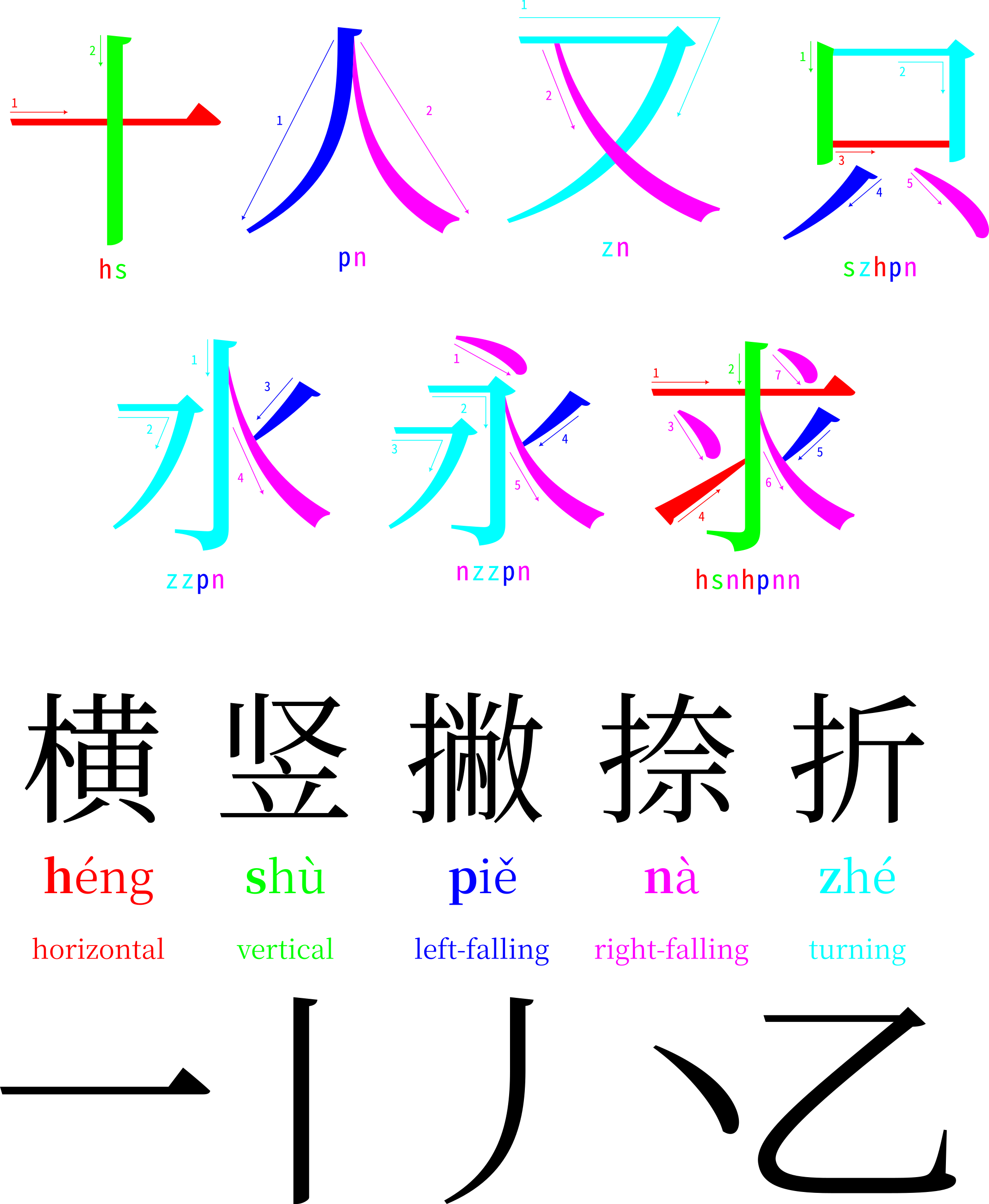
Decomposition of some characters by their basic strokes. Some implementations of this input method assign the keys "h", "s", "p", "n" and z", which are the first letter of the pinyin of the name of the basic stroke they correspond to

The Stroke Count Method (Chinese: 笔画; pinyin: bǐ huà), Wubihua method, Stroke input method or Bihua IME (Chinese: 五笔画输入法; pinyin: wǔ bǐhuà shūrù fǎ or Chinese: 筆劃輸入法; pinyin: Bǐhuà shūrù fǎ) (lit. 5-stroke input method) is a relatively simple Chinese input method for writing text on a computer or a mobile phone. It is based on the stroke order of a word, not pronunciation. It uses five or six buttons, and is often placed on a numerical keypad. Although it is possible to input Traditional Chinese characters with this method, this method is often associated with Simplified Chinese characters. The Wubihua method should not be confused with the Wubi method.

Each of the five keys from 1 to 5 are assigned a certain type of stroke (resembling the Eight Principles of Yong; these five are sometimes called 橫竖撇捺折 (橫豎撇捺折; héng-shù-piē-nà-zhé) with each character of this phrase being a one-syllable description of the respective five strokes: (Note: In the list 橫竖撇捺折 (héng-shù-piē-nà-zhé), the fourth stroke (捺; nà) is also sometimes called 点 (diǎn), i.e. 橫竖撇点折; 橫豎撇點折; héng-shù-piē-diǎn-zhé.)

1. A horizontal stroke from left to right (一)
2. A vertical stroke from top to bottom (丨)
3. A long diagonal stroke downward from right to left (丿)
4. A very short dash stroke downward from left to right (丶)
5. A horizontal stroke from left to right, ending with a downwards hook to the left (乙)

To input any character, the user simply presses the keys corresponding to the strokes of a character then select from a list of matching characters. The list of suggestions to choose from becomes more and more specific as more digits of the code are entered. The system will not recognize a character input with an incorrect stroke order. Some people find this method of entering characters into a mobile phone to be faster than pinyin. In fact, as pinyin is based upon Mandarin Chinese, many Chinese people – particularly in the southern regions of China like Hong Kong and Macau – who speak other varieties of Chinese and never learned pinyin relied solely on this method of entering characters on their phones, until touchscreen-based smartphones allowed the possibility of handwriting recognition.

Wubihua is one of the easiest to learn methods because it is simple and does not require knowledge of pronunciation or pinyin. However, it tends to be vague, as a Wubihua code will normally match ten characters, and each character has one correct code, which confuses users whose stroke orders are wrong.

Strokes map to Wubihua input generally according to the following table:

Wubihua Character	Stroke Type	Stroke	Name of stroke (simplified Chinese and pinyin)
1	Horizontal, or Rising		横; Héng
1	Horizontal, or Rising		提; Tí
2	Vertical		竖; Shù
2	Vertical		竖钩; Shù Gōu
3	Falling to the Left		撇; Piě
4	Dot, or Falling to the Right		点; Diǎn
4	Dot, or Falling to the Right		捺; Nà
4	Dot, or Falling to the Right		提捺; Tí Nà
5	Turning		横折; Héng Zhé
5	Turning		横撇; Héng Piě
5	Turning		横钩; Héng Gōu
5	Turning		竖折; Shù Zhé
5	Turning		竖弯; Shù Wān
5	Turning		竖提; Shù Tí
5	Turning		撇折; Piě Zhé
5	Turning		撇点; Piě Diǎn
5	Turning		撇钩; Piě Gōu
5	Turning		弯钩; Wān Gōu
5	Turning		斜钩; Xié Gōu
5	Turning		横折折; Héng Zhé Zhé
5	Turning		横折弯; Héng Zhé Wān
5	Turning		横折提; Héng Zhé Tí
5	Turning		横折钩; Héng Zhé Gōu
5	Turning		横斜钩; Héng Xié Gōu
5	Turning		竖折折; Shù Zhé Zhé
5	Turning		竖折撇; Shù Zhé Piě
5	Turning		竖弯钩; Shù Wān Gōu
5	Turning		横折折折; Héng Zhé Zhé Zhé
5	Turning		横折折撇; Héng Zhé Zhé Piě
5	Turning		横折弯钩; Héng Zhé Wān Gōu
5	Turning		横撇弯钩; Héng Piě Wān Gōu
5	Turning		竖折折钩; Shù Zhé Zhé Gōu
5	Turning		横折折折钩; Héng Zhé Zhé Zhé Gōu

== See also ==
- Wubi method
- Chinese input methods for computers
- Stroke (CJK character)
- Eight principles of yong: how stroke styles are taught to student calligraphers
