= Journal of Chinese Information Processing =

Chinese academic journal

Journal of Chinese Information Processing (simplified Chinese: 中文信息学报; traditional Chinese: 中文信息學報; pinyin: Zhōngwén Xìnxī Xuébào) is the journal of Chinese Information Processing Society of China. It was founded in 1986 and has been focused on publishing academic papers on the basic theory and applied technology of Chinese information processing, as well as related overviews, research results, technical reports, book reviews, special discussions, domestic and foreign academic trends, etc. It aims to reflect the development and academic trends in the field of Chinese information processing in a timely manner.

Journal of Chinese Information Processing has long been included in many important domestic and foreign databases such as the Chinese Science Citation Database (CSCD), Chinese Core Journals, and Chinese Science and Technology Core Journals. Its contents represent the advanced level of Chinese information processing in China.

== History ==
- In 1986, Journal of Chinese Information Processing was founded.
- In 1987, the publication period was changed from annual to quarterly.
- In 1999, the publication period was changed from quarterly to bimonthly.
- In 2018, the publication period was changed from bimonthly to monthly.

== Contents and readership ==
The contents published in Journal of Chinese Information Processing include: Computational Linguistics; Language resources; Machine Translation (MT) and Machine-Assisted Translation (MAT); Chinese and minority language processing; Chinese handwriting and print recognition (OCR); Chinese speech recognition and speech synthesis and text-to-speech conversion (TTS); information retrieval (IR) and information extraction (IE); online search engines; data mining, knowledge acquisition, neural networks, machine learning, expert systems, knowledge engineering and other Artificial Intelligence (AI) technologies.

Intended readers include computer science researchers, engineering and technical personnel, software development and application personnel, teachers and senior students in colleges and universities, graduate students, etc.

== Citation indexes and databases ==
Journal of Chinese Information Processing is a source journal of the following indexes and databases:

- China Science and Technology Paper Statistics (China Science and Technology Core Journals) (中国科技论文统计源期刊（中国科技核心期刊))
- China Core Journals (Selected) Database (中国核心期刊（遴选）数据库收录期刊)
- National Chinese Language Core Journals (全国中文核心期刊)
- China Academic Journals Comprehensive Evaluation Database (中国学术期刊综合评价数据库收录期刊)
- Chinese Journal Full-text Database (full-text journals) (中国期刊全文数据库全文收录期刊)
- China Science and Technology Journals Premium Database (中国科技期刊精品数据库收录期刊)
- Chinese Science Citation Database (中国科学引文数据库收录期刊)
- Chinese Science and Technology Periodicals Database (中文科技期刊数据库收录期刊)
- CEPS Chinese Electronic Journal Service Database (full-text) (CEPS中文电子期刊服务数据库全文收录期刊)
- China Academic Journal Abstracts (Chinese version and English version) (《中国学术期刊文摘》（中文版与英文版）收录期刊)

== Editorial board ==
The Sixth Editorial Board include:

- Editor-in-Chief: Sun Maosong (孙茂松, Tsinghua University)
- Associate editors: Sun Le (孙乐, Institute of Software, Chinese Academy of Sciences), Yang Erhong (杨尔弘, Beijing Language and Culture University)
- Members: (51 people)

== Social evaluation ==
The Journal of Chinese Information Processing is one of the 15 core journals rated among 83 Chinese journals in the field of computer and computing technology in China. The content it publishes represents the advanced level of Chinese information processing and has considerable reference value for readers.
