= Zhengma method =

Stroke-based Chinese character input method

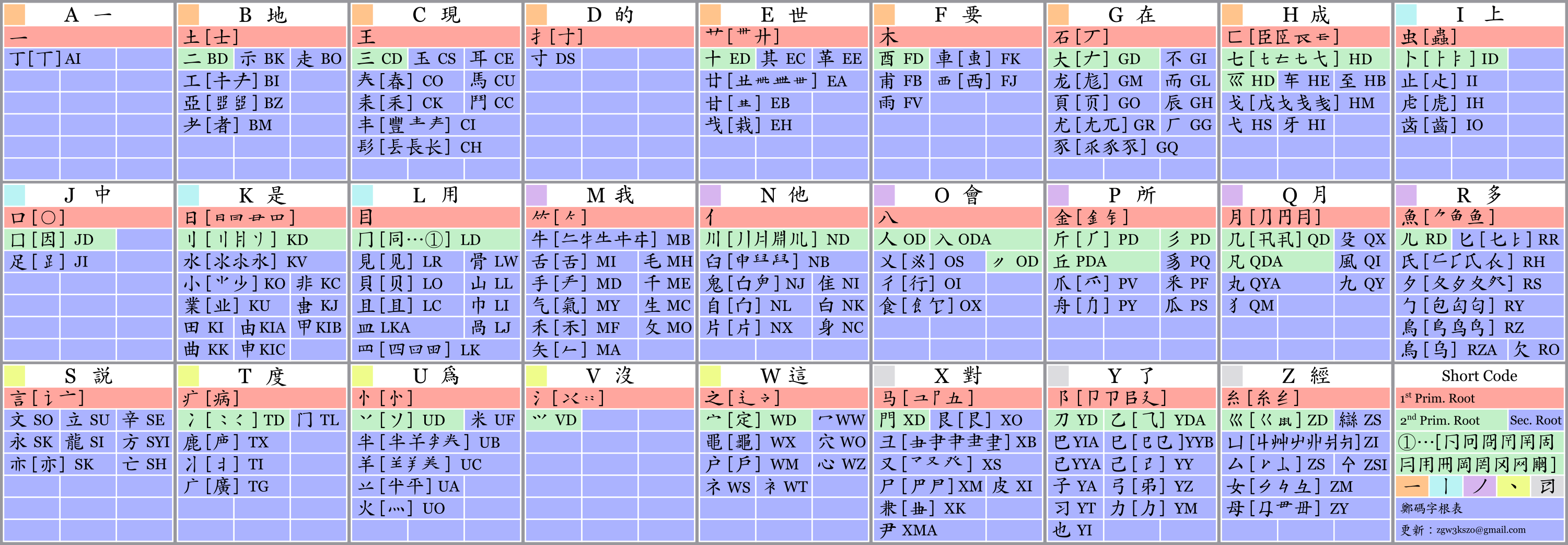
The key mappings for the Zhengma Input Method

The Zhengma Input Method (Simplified Chinese: 郑码输入法, Traditional Chinese: 鄭碼輸入法) (also referred to as Zheng code method) is a Chinese language input method. The primary goal of Zhengma design is compatibility with different types of characters (ability to input both simplified Chinese and traditional Chinese), scalability (it works well with extremely large sets of ideographs) and ease of use, especially for people who are experienced with how ideographs are formed. For these reasons this input method is used more by scholars of the Chinese language or people who need to use both traditional and simplified Chinese. This input method is one of several shape-based input methods to support simplified chinese that are included with Microsoft Windows XP.

Zhengma is similar to the Wubi method, but has different stroke coding.

Under Linux, this input method is supported by the following IME packages:

- fcitx
- ibus
