= Character amnesia =

Loss of character memory in Chinese speakers

- Traditional Chinese: 提筆忘字
- Simplified Chinese: 提笔忘字
- Literal meaning: pick up pen, forget the character
Transcriptions
Standard Mandarin
- Hanyu Pinyin: tíbǐwàngzì
Yue: Cantonese
- Jyutping: tai4 bat1 mong4 zi6

Character amnesia is a phenomenon where experienced and native speakers of some East Asian languages, mostly Mandarin and Japanese, forget how to write Chinese characters previously well-known to them. The phenomenon is specifically tied to prolonged and extensive use of input methods, such as those that use romanizations of characters, and is documented to be a significant issue in China and Japan. Modern technologies, such as mobile phones and computers, allow users to enter Chinese characters using a phonetic transcription without knowing how to write them by hand. Whether or not the phenomenon is as widespread or troubling as some have claimed is the subject of debate.

== Background ==
Chinese characters are a logographic form of writing, where the form of the character is not always directly related to its pronunciation. The characters are composed of a combination of 8–11 standard strokes, over a hundred common radicals, and hundreds of phonetic components. The characters can be very complex and learning them is a highly neuro-muscular task, meaning that it is difficult to remember how to write the characters without repetitive practice in writing them by hand. Scientific studies have also shown that while reading utilizes diverse areas of the brain, reading Chinese makes unique usage of distinct parts of the frontal and temporal areas of the brain associated with motor memory and handwriting.

It is difficult to establish exactly how many Chinese characters are in use today; the new HSK, a widely used proficiency test for Standard Chinese as a second language, tests 3,000 characters, while in 2013 the People's Republic of China published the List of Commonly Used Standard Chinese Characters, which contains 8,105 characters. In Japan, where a smaller set of characters are in general usage, the Japanese Ministry of Education prescribes the teaching of 2,136 kanji in primary and secondary school in a list called the jōyō kanji, meaning "regular-use Chinese characters".

Chinese character literacy in both China and Japan is taught by rote memorization, where schoolchildren become proficient at writing characters by writing them by hand repeatedly. As a result of people becoming less reliant on handwriting and more willing to use computer input methods, they are no longer exposed to the necessary reinforcement to retain the ability to write the characters. Those affected by character amnesia are still capable of reading text and visually recognizing characters, but are unable to write some characters by hand, usually those less frequently used, without the aid of an input method device such as a mobile phone or computer.

== Changing ways of writing Chinese characters ==
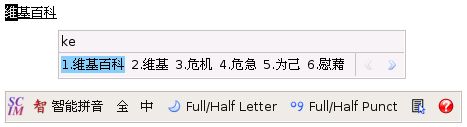
SCIM pinyin input method used to type Chinese on a computer

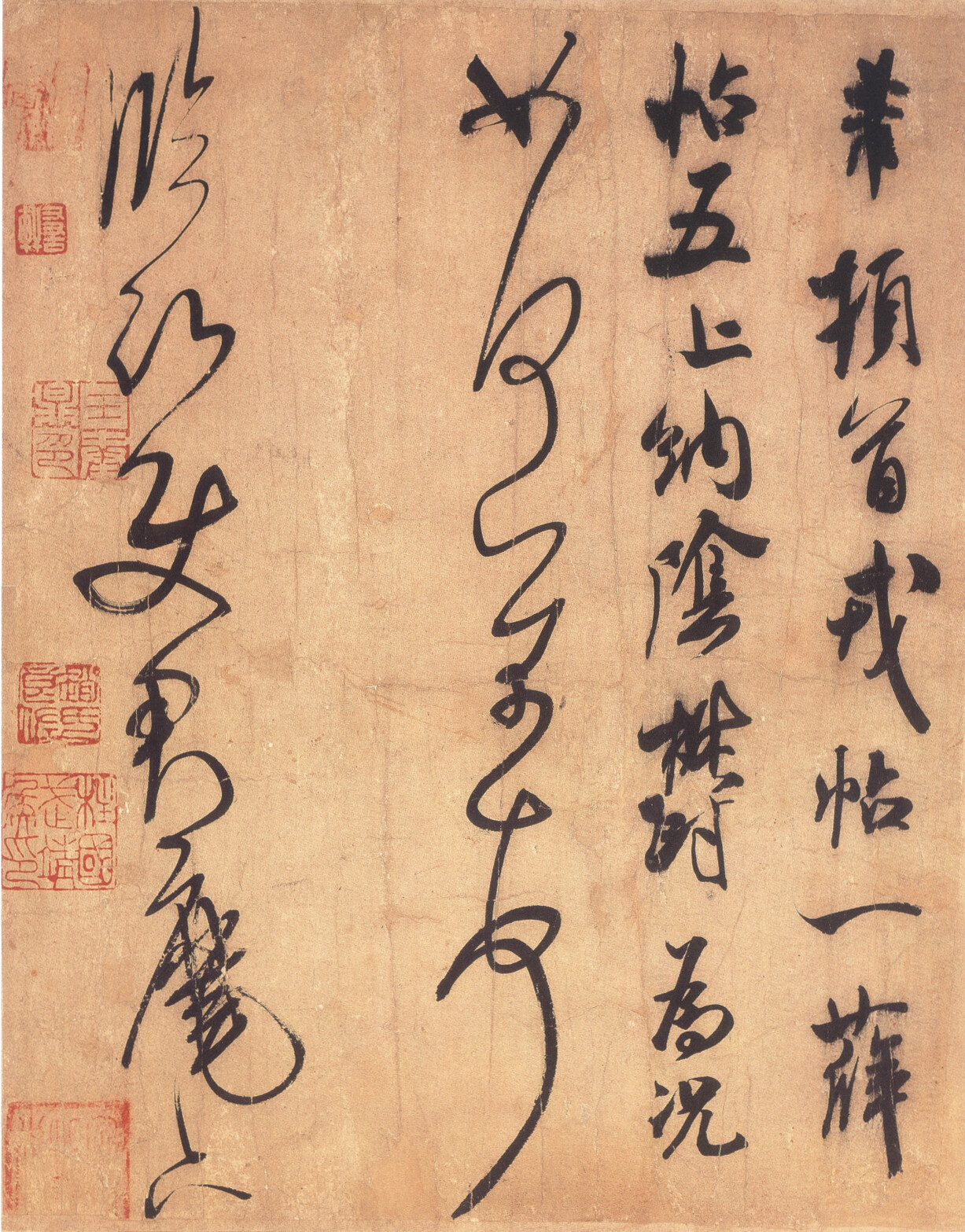
Letter written by hand in an expressive style using brush and ink – Mi Fu, 11th century

Until the 20th century, Chinese characters were written with brush and ink. In the early 20th century when the pen became the dominant method of writing in China and Japan, critics complained that the expressiveness of Chinese characters would be lost. Calligraphy is, however, still a thriving art form throughout East Asia.

In the 1980s electronic typewriters and later personal computers provided people in China and Japan an alternative to writing by hand. With the advent of the World Wide Web in 1991 and the subsequent widespread use of email, internet chat, and discussion forums, people began using computers to communicate with each other in Chinese and Japanese. Today, increased computer usage and the use of SMS text-messaging, especially among young people, means that a large portion of their everyday use of Chinese characters is done using input methods, not by hand. In a 2010 survey by Dayang Net, 43 percent of respondents said they use the computer all the time for their jobs and 43 percent said that they only write out characters by hand when filling out forms or writing their signature.

Some input methods are, in fact, related to the structure of the character, as opposed to those based on pronunciation. Cangjie is one popular example of such a structure based input method for Chinese. Input methods based on phonetic transcription which do not require the user to know how to write the character by hand are the most popular, because they are easier to use. In China, more than 97 percent of computer users enter Chinese characters using such a phonetic input method.

A parallel phenomenon has appeared involving the increased use of input methods to write Chinese characters and the difficulty of remembering such a large set of characters. The use of word processors allows the user to write using characters that the user does not remember how to write by hand. Around the 1980s in Japan, this resulted in the reappearance of older, more complex characters which had been removed from official word lists. The number of characters available for use on a word processor far exceeds the number of characters a person can readily remember how to write by hand. While many have blamed the use of input methods for difficulty remembering how to write the characters by hand, widespread use of input methods may be responsible for a reversal in the decline of kanji use in Japan.

A way that smartphone developers have been attempting to combat this problem is their inclusion of active pens and handwriting options for their operating systems.

== Evidence ==
Anecdotal evidence of character amnesia is plentiful, but there has been insufficient scientific study of the phenomenon. There are, however, a few surveys which reinforce the claim that character amnesia exists among users of written Chinese and Japanese. China Youth Daily surveyed 2,072 people in April 2010 and found that 83 percent reported having trouble writing characters. A similar Dayang Net survey found that 80 percent of respondents acknowledged having forgotten how to write some characters. In 2008 the Ministry of Education of the People's Republic of China conducted a survey of 3,000 teachers, where sixty percent complained of declining writing ability. Another anecdotal example can be seen during a spelling bee show hosted on CCTV in 2013, where only 30% of participants were able to write "toad" (Chinese: 癞蛤蟆; pinyin: Làiháma) in Chinese.

While some claim that text messaging is the primary cause of character amnesia, the phenomenon, at least in Japan, appears to have originated with the widespread use of word processors. An article in The Asahi Shimbun from 23 September 1985 reports that students found it increasingly difficult to remember how to write even quite simple kanji by hand since the full-scale introduction of word processors at a university campus in Isehara. A 1993 survey of members of the Information Processing Society of Japan found that habitual word processor users reported declining ability to write characters by hand. The Japanese term "word-processor idiot" (ワープロ馬鹿, wāpurobaka) describes a person whose handwriting ability has deteriorated due to overreliance on computer input methods.

== Treatment ==
In China, the Ministry of Education has attempted to counteract the problem of character amnesia through the promotion of traditional Chinese calligraphy classes. In 2011, the ministry's instructions included increasing the frequency of calligraphy classes for younger students to once every week and optional classes and after-school activities for older students.

== See also ==
- Bopomofo – phonetic transliteration system used by popular input methods in Taiwan
- Chinese input methods for computers
- Gestaltzerfall
- Japanese input method
- Pinyin – romanization system for Mandarin Chinese
- Tip of the tongue
