= KanjiTalk =

Classic Mac OS localization

KanjiTalk was the name given by Apple to its Japanese language localization of the classic Mac OS. It consisted of translated applications, a set of Japanese fonts, and a Japanese input method called Kotoeri. The software was sold and supported only in Japan. It was available for purchase through other resellers in the United States, but Apple did not support its use outside Japan.

Early versions of KanjiTalk were based on a proprietary Kanji script input system called 2.0 and 2.1. Developments following version 2.0 laid the groundwork for what eventually became Kotoeri, introduced with System 7.1.

KanjiTalk 1.0 debuted in 1986, alongside Apple's universal System 3.0, and first distributed with the Mac Plus. It was followed with limited version updates, up to 2.0, 6.0, and then parallel updates with Apple's System 7. Apple had intended to ship its new PowerBook models with System 7, but development of the new OS was taking longer than anticipated, so Apple released a special version of System 6.0.7.1, with support for KanjiTalk, in order to market its new laptops in Japan. The PowerBook 100 was co-designed and manufactured by Sony.

KanjiTalk was succeeded by Apple's more standardized precursor to Unicode, known as WorldScript, from System 7.1 to Mac OS 9.2.2, before Mac OS X. This was a controversial decision, as it did not adequately provide for all of the traditional Kanji characters.
