= ISO 3166-2:TW =

Entry for Taiwan in ISO 3166-2

ISO 3166-2:TW is the entry for Taiwan, "Taiwan, Province of China", or "Taiwan (Province of China)", in ISO 3166-2, part of the ISO 3166 standard published by the International Organization for Standardization (ISO), which defines codes for the names of the principal subdivisions (e.g., provinces or states) of all countries coded in ISO 3166-1.

ISO 3166-2:TW defines codes for the subdivisions of Taiwan located on the islands of Taiwan (Formosa), Penghu (Pescadores), Kinmen, Matsu (Lienchiang), and their subsidiary islands. These areas are de facto under the administration of the government of the Republic of China which resides in Taipei. The government of the People's Republic of China, which resides in Beijing, also claims these islands but considers ROC-held Fujian islands of Kinmen and Matsu to be within its Fujian Province, not its nominal Taiwan Province (ISO 3166-2 code: CN-TW).

Currently ISO 3166-2:TW lists 13 counties, three cities and six special municipalities. Constitutionally the counties and cities are part of the ROC provinces of Taiwan and Fujian, but since the provincial governments were largely streamlined in 1998 these 22 subdivisions are regarded as the principal subdivisions of Republic of China (Taiwan).

== Format ==
- Each code consists of two parts, separated by a hyphen. The first part is TW, the ISO 3166-1 alpha-2 code of Taiwan. The second part is three letters.
- The divisions in the list are categorized in three types:
  - Cities: Romanized as shih (市) and formerly called "municipalities" in ISO 3166-2. The divisions carry City (市) in their official names.
  - Counties: Romanized as hsien (縣) and formerly called "districts" in ISO 3166-2. The divisions carry County (縣) in their official names.
  - Special municipalities: Romanized as chih-hsia-shih (直轄市). The divisions also carry City (市) in their official names.
- Taiwan is currently assigned the ISO 3166-2 code CN-TW under ISO 3166-2:CN, as China solely claims it as a province of China.

== Current codes ==
Subdivision names are listed as in the ISO 3166-2 standard published by the ISO 3166 Maintenance Agency (ISO 3166/MA).

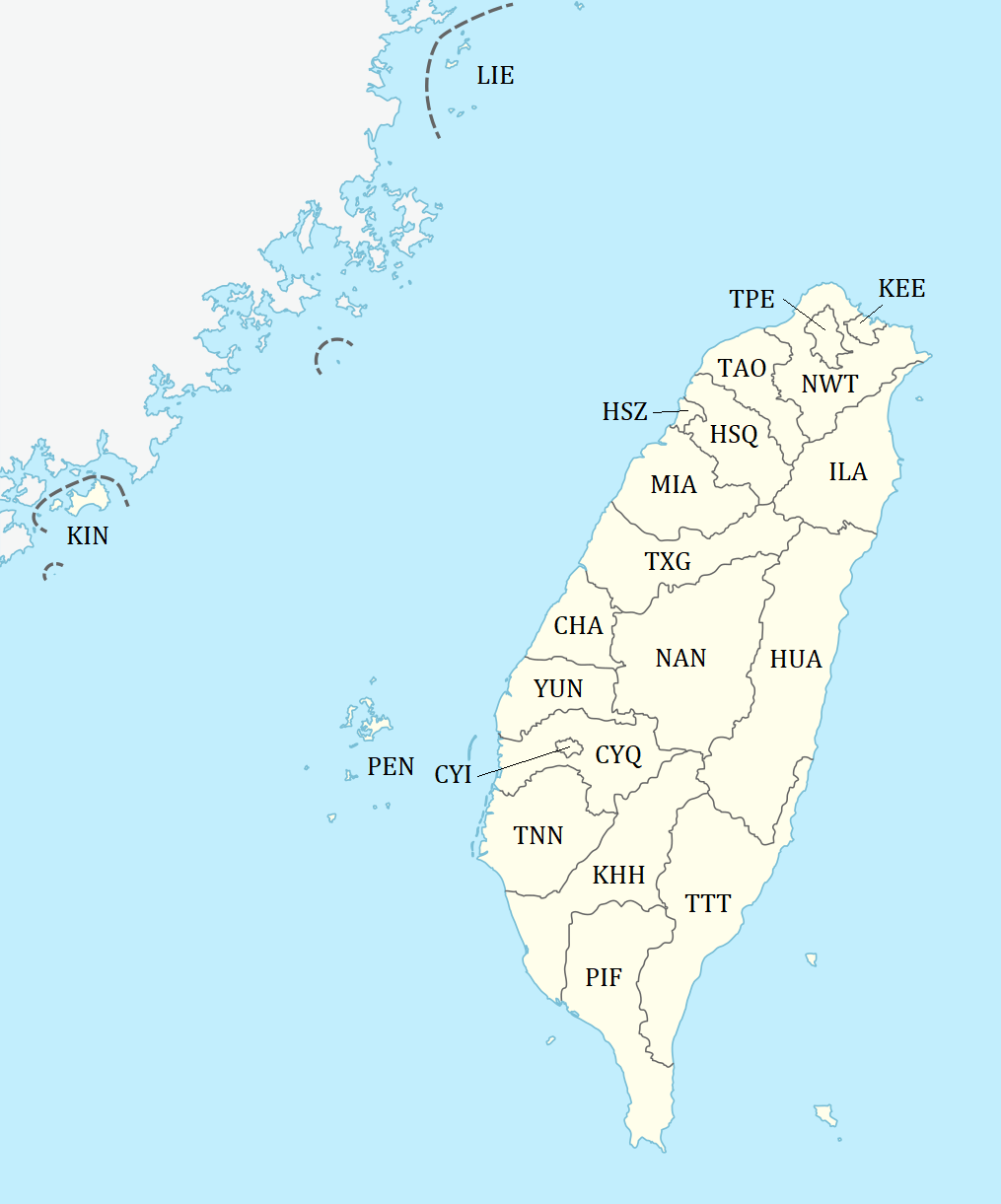
ISO 3166-2:TW since 2015-11-27

Code	Subdivision name (zh) (conventional names)	Subdivision name (zh) (Note: For reference only, Chinese name in Chinese script not included in the ISO 3166-2 standard.)	Subdivision category
TW-CHA	Changhua	彰化	county
TW-CYI	Chiayi	嘉義	city
TW-CYQ	Chiayi	嘉義	county
TW-HSZ	Hsinchu	新竹	city
TW-HSQ	Hsinchu	新竹	county
TW-HUA	Hualien	花蓮	county
TW-KHH	Kaohsiung	高雄	special municipality
TW-KEE	Keelung	基隆	city
TW-KIN	Kinmen	金門	county
TW-LIE	Lienchiang	連江	county
TW-MIA	Miaoli	苗栗	county
TW-NAN	Nantou	南投	county
TW-NWT	New Taipei	新北	special municipality
TW-PEN	Penghu	澎湖	county
TW-PIF	Pingtung	屏東	county
TW-TXG	Taichung	臺中	special municipality
TW-TNN	Tainan	臺南	special municipality
TW-TPE	Taipei	臺北	special municipality
TW-TTT	Taitung	臺東	county
TW-TAO	Taoyuan	桃園	special municipality
TW-ILA	Yilan	宜蘭	county
TW-YUN	Yunlin	雲林	county

== Changes ==
The following changes to the entry have been announced by the ISO 3166/MA since the first publication of ISO 3166-2 in 1998. ISO stopped issuing newsletters in 2013.

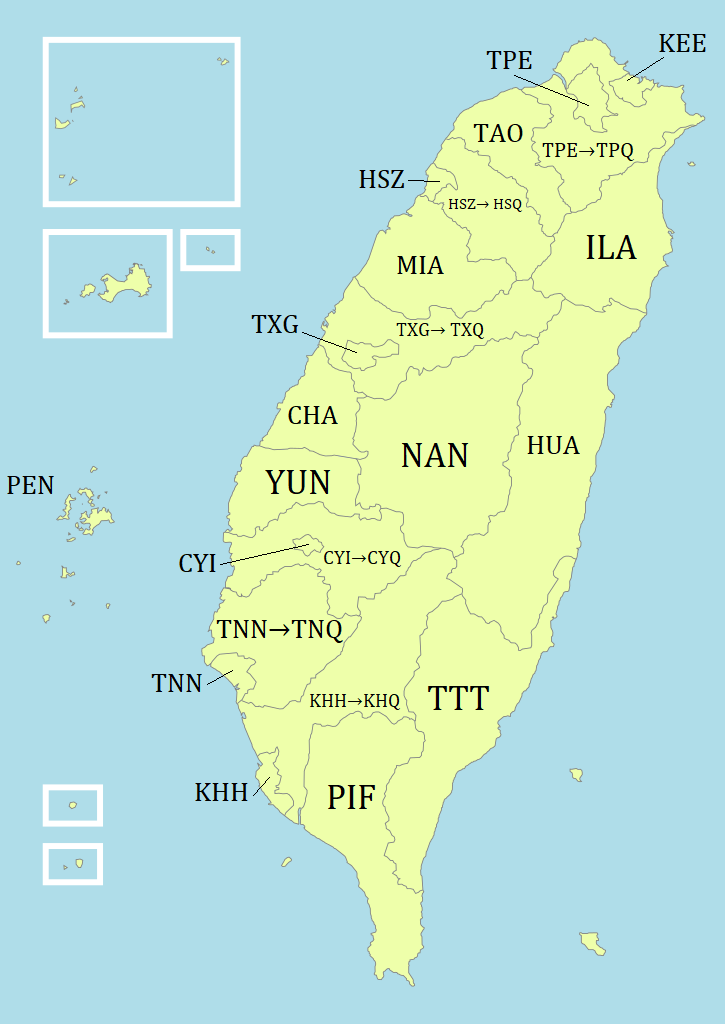
Changes to ISO 3166-2:TW on 2002-12-10 when Kinmen and Matsu were not yet coded

Newsletter/OBP	Date issued	Description of change in newsletter	Code/Subdivision change
Newsletter I-4	2002-12-10	Error correction: Duplicate use of six code elements corrected. Subdivision categories in header re-sorted	Codes: (to correct duplicate use): Chiayi (district): TW-CYI → TW-CYQ; Hsinchu (district): TW-HSZ → TW-HSQ; Kaohsiung (district): TW-KHH → TW-KHQ; Taichung (district): TW-TXG → TW-TXQ; Tainan (district): TW-TNN → TW-TNQ; Taipei (district): TW-TPE → TW-TPQ
Online Browsing; Platform (OBP)	2015-11-27	Addition of category name for special municipality in zho; change of spelling of TW-ILA; deletion of districts TW-KHQ, TW-TNQ, TW-TPQ, TW-TXQ; addition of districts TW-KIN, TW-LIE and special municipality TW-NWT; change of subdivision category from municipalities to special municipalities for TW-TXG, TW-TNN; change of subdivision category from district to special municipality for TW-TAO; update List Source.	Subdivision added: Kinmen (district): TW-KIN; Lienchiang (district): TW-LIE; New Taipei (special municipality): TW-NWT; Subdivision deleted: Kaohsiung (district): TW-KHQ; Tainan (district): TW-TNQ; Taipei (district): TW-TPQ; Taichung (district): TW-TXQ; Subdivision category changed: Taoyuan (TW-TAO): district → special municipality; Tainan (TW-TNN): municipality → special municipality; Taichung (TW-TXG): municipality → special municipality
Online Browsing; Platform (OBP)	2016-11-15	Change of subdivision category from municipality to city and district to county; update List Source	(each) district → county; (each) municipality → city

== See also ==
- Administrative divisions of Taiwan
- FIPS region codes of Taiwan
- Taiwan, China#Taiwanese reactions
