= Taiwan under Chinese rule =

Taiwan under Chinese rule can refer to:

- Kingdom of Tungning
- Taiwan under Qing rule
- Taiwan, governed by the Republic of China
- Taiwan Province, People's Republic of China, theoretical province of the PRC
