= Taiwan, China =

Term for Taiwan as part of China

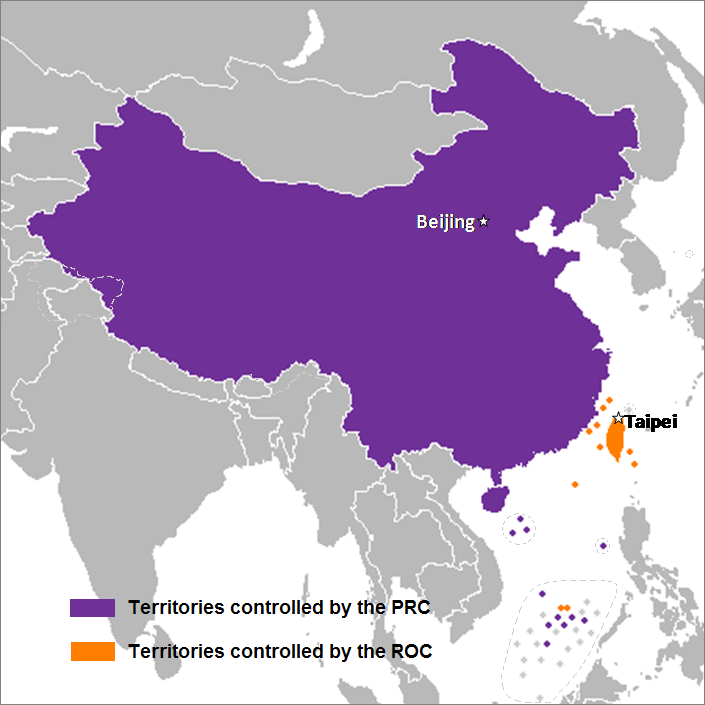
- Territory controlled by the People's Republic of China (purple) and the Republic of China (orange). The size of minor islands has been exaggerated in this map for ease of identification.

Chinese name
- Traditional Chinese: 中國臺灣
- Simplified Chinese: 中国台湾
Transcriptions
Standard Mandarin
- Hanyu Pinyin: Zhōngguó Táiwān
- Bopomofo: ㄓㄨㄥ ㄍㄨㄛˊ ㄊㄞˊ ㄨㄢ
- Gwoyeu Romatzyh: Jong'gwo Tair'uan
- Wade–Giles: Chung^{1}-kuo^{2} T'ai²-wan¹
- Tongyong Pinyin: Jhongguó Táiwan
- IPA: [ʈʂʊ́ŋ.kwǒ] [tʰǎɪ.wán]
Wu
- Romanization: Tson^{平}-koh^{入} The^{平}-uae^{平}
Xiang
- IPA: Tan^{33}-kwɛ^{24}/ dwɛ^{13} ua^{44}
Hakka
- Romanization: Dung^{24}-gued^{2} Thòi-vàn
Yue: Cantonese
- Yale Romanization: Jūng-gwok Tòiwāan
- Jyutping: Zung1-gwok3 Toi4waan1
Southern Min
- Hokkien POJ: Tiong-kok Tâi-oân
Eastern Min
- Fuzhou BUC: Dṳ̆ng-guók Dài-uăng

Taiwan Province of China (Note: UN M49 and ISO 3166 use different punctuation for different purposes.)
- Traditional Chinese: 中國臺灣省
- Simplified Chinese: 中国台湾省
Transcriptions
Standard Mandarin
- Hanyu Pinyin: Zhōngguó Táiwānshěng

Tibetan name
- Tibetan: ཐའེ་ཝན, ཀྲུང་གོ་
Transcriptions
- Wylie: Tha'e wan, Krung-go

Zhuang name
- Zhuang: Daizvanh Cunggoz

Mongolian name
- Mongolian Cyrillic: Тайвань Хятад
- Mongolian script: ᠲᠠᠶᠢᠪᠠᠨᠢ ᠬᠢᠲᠠᠳ
Transcriptions
- SASM/GNC: Taivan Khyatad

Uyghur name
- Uyghur: تەيۋەن، جۇڭگو تەيۋەن، خىتاي
Transcriptions
- Latin Yëziqi: Teywen, Junggo; Teywen, Xitay
- Siril Yëziqi: Тәйвән, Җунгго; Тәйвән, Хитай

"Taiwan, China", "Taiwan, Province of China", and "Taipei, China" are political terms that claim Taiwan and its associated territories as a province or territory of the People's Republic of China.

The term "Taiwan, China" (Chinese: 中国台湾) is used by Chinese state media, organizations and individuals. However the People's Republic of China – which is widely recognized by the international community as the legitimate representative of "China" – has never exercised jurisdiction over Taiwan and other islands controlled by the Republic of China (ROC).

Such terms are ambiguous because of the political status of Taiwan and cross-Strait relations between "Taiwan" and "China". Since 1949, two political entities with the name "China" exist, each claiming to be the sole legitimate government of their combined territory:

- The People's Republic of China (PRC) known today as "China", "Mainland China" or "the Chinese mainland", historically known in Western Bloc countries as "Communist China", "Maoist China", "Red China."
- The Republic of China (ROC) known today as "Taiwan" or the "Free area of the Republic of China", historically known in the Western Bloc as "China" (before the widespread recognition of the PRC in the 1970s), "Nationalist China", and "Free China."

The Chinese Communist Party (CCP) officially mandates the use of terms like "Taiwan, China". In contrast, the ROC government, along with supporters of Taiwan Independence, rejects them; citing that it denies the ROC's sovereignty and existence while reducing both its political and territorial status to a province of mainland China.

Minor spelling and translation variations exist, such as "Taiwan Province of China", "Taiwan (Province of China)", "China Taiwan", "Chinese Taiwan", and "Taiwan (China)".

== Claims of two "China" ==
The dispute and ambiguity over the meaning of "China" and which "China" stemmed from the division of Republic of China into two Chinas at the "end" of the Chinese Civil War in 1955. (Note: There is some debate whether the war has ended since the two Chinas are still fighting for international recognition and assurance of sovereignty. See Chinese Civil War for details.) (Fighting between the two merely eased off after 1949 and no signing of a peace treaty or armistice ever occurred; the PRC still threatens attack on ROC/Taiwan when it deems necessary.) The term "China" historically meant the various regimes and imperial dynasties which controlled territories in mainland Asia prior to 1911, when the imperial system was overthrown and the Republic of China (ROC) was established as an Asian republic. In 1927, the Chinese Civil War started between the Kuomintang (KMT, founding party of the ROC) and the CCP. The CCP eventually won control of most of ROC's original territory (mainland China) in 1949, when they proclaimed the "People's Republic of China" (PRC) on that territory.

Since then, two Chinas have existed, although the PRC was not internationally recognized then. The Republic of China government retrieved Taiwan in 1945 back from Japan, then fled in 1949 to Taiwan with the aim to retake mainland China. Both the ROC and the PRC still officially (constitutionally) claim mainland China and the Taiwan Area as part of their respective territories In reality, the PRC rules only mainland China and has no control of but claims Taiwan as part of its territory under its "One China Principle". The ROC, which rules only the Taiwan Area (composed of Taiwan and its nearby minor islands), became known as "Taiwan" after its largest island, (an instance of pars pro toto). Constitutional reform in 1991 amended electoral laws to focus on the territory controlled by the Republic of China, increasingly referred to as "the Republic of China on Taiwan" or simply "Taiwan".

After the 2008 election of Ma Ying-jeou, he again asserted that mainland China is part of Republic of China territory according to its constitution, and, in 2013, he stated that relations between PRC and ROC are not between countries but "regions of the same country".

In 1971, the People's Republic of China won the United Nations seat as "China" and the ROC withdrew from the UN. Since then the term "Taiwan, China" is a designation officially used in international organizations including the United Nations and its associated organs to refer to the Republic of China. (The term "Chinese Taipei" was similarly created for the same purpose.) However, the political status of Taiwan is a complex and controversial issue and currently unresolved, in large part due to the United States and the Allies of World War II handling of the surrender of Taiwan from Japan in 1945 (which was to be a temporary administration by the ROC troops), and the Treaty of Peace with Japan ("Treaty of San Francisco") in 1951, for which neither the ROC nor the PRC was invited, and left Taiwan's sovereignty legally undefined in international law and in dispute.

== The "Province of Taiwan" ==
The term "Taiwan, (Province of) China" is also potentially ambiguous because both the ROC and the PRC each has administratively a "Taiwan Province", Taiwan Province, Republic of China and "Taiwan Province, People's Republic of China", and neither of these provinces covers the Matsu Islands, Wuchiu, Kinmen, all of which have been retained by the Republic of China. Geographically speaking, they both refer to the same place. Without more specific indication, it is unclear to which "Taiwan Province" is being directed. However, since China (PRC) has never had sovereignty over Taiwan and its "Taiwan Province" exists only as a claim, as a practical matter, "Taiwan Province" refers only to the Taiwan Province under Republic of China's administration.

Although the word "China" could also possibly be interpreted to mean "Republic of China", this interpretation is no longer common since "China" is typically understood as referring to the PRC after the ROC lost its UN seat as "China" in 1971, and is considered a term distinct from "Taiwan", the name with which the ROC has become identified. Also, only the ROC's Taiwan Province exists in reality and is under the ROC's actual territorial control, whereas the PRC's "Taiwan Province" exists only on paper, under the PRC's administrative structure but without an actual provincial government. Instead, the PRC has a Taiwan Affairs Office of the State Council to deal with issues and policy guidelines relating to Taiwan.

The ROC also does not refer to its Taiwan Province as "Taiwan, China" in English but rather as "Taiwan Province, Republic of China" (中華民國臺灣省; Zhōnghuá Mínguó Táiwānshěng), and typically such reference only occurs in the Chinese language in the ROC's official documents and as the marquee in the administrative offices of Taiwan Province government. However, references to the province is now rare since the Taiwan Provincial Government has largely been dissolved and its functions transferred to the central government or county governments since 1997. Therefore, recent uses of the term "Taiwan, Province of China" appears mainly in PRC-controlled media like CCTV (Chinese Central Television) and in the ISO 3166-1 codes.

== Taipei, China ==
The term "Taipei, China" (中國台北/中国台北), sometimes also translated as "China Taipei", is the PRC's unilaterally preferred Chinese translation for the English term "Chinese Taipei" (中華台北/中华台北). It is one of the PRC's officially endorsed terms when referring to Taiwan politically, and has been used in state media in much the same manner as "Taiwan, China" or "Taiwan, Province of China".

== Objections ==
=== The Government of the Republic of China (Taiwan) ===
The Republic of China (ROC) is not allowed to use its official name internationally and uses "Chinese Taipei" in other organizations like the Olympics and FIBA. The ROC sees its use as a denial of the ROC's status as a separate sovereign state, diminishing it under "China", which implicitly is the PRC.

In an incident on May 10, 2011, the World Health Organization referred to Taiwan as "Taiwan, China" in its documents. (The ROC participates in the WHO under the name "Chinese Taipei") ROC president Ma Ying-jeou protested the WHO's action and accused the PRC of "pressuring the UN body into calling" the ROC "Chinese territory", and stated that Beijing's moves were "very negative" for bilateral ties.

In August 2023, amid escalating tensions, the PRC strongly objected to the ROC Vice President (and future President) Lai Ching-te's US visit, vowing forceful actions and labeling Lai a "troublemaker" for advocating Taiwan's independence. The visit coincides with increased Chinese military activity near Taiwan, underscoring the ongoing strained relations and Beijing's determination to suppress sovereignty efforts.

=== The United States ===
The US official policy enunciated in 2014 is to recognize the PRC government as the sole legal government of China, but the US does not endorse, only acknowledge, the PRC's position that Taiwan is a part of China, and has considered Taiwan's political status as "undetermined." The US also repeatedly refuted the PRC's unilateral interpretation regarding the UN General Assembly Resolution 2758 by "falsely conflating it with China's 'one China' principle, and wrongly asserts that it reflects an international consensus for its 'one China' principle", The governments of Taiwan and the US have emphasis that the Resolution 2758 "does not mention Taiwan, does not state that Taiwan is part of the PRC, and does not explicitly authorize Beijing to represent Taiwan in the UN system." And the resolution does not constitute an institutional UN position on the political status of Taiwan and use it to balk at Taiwan's meaningful participation in the UN system.

== Usage ==
=== The United Nations and the ISO ===
==== UN M49 ====
The Chinese and Taiwanese entries in UN M49 would evolve as follows:

Year version	Source page(s)	Code 156	Code 158	Chinese representation in the United Nations
1970	8, 19, 28, 33	China (mainland)	China (Taiwan)	Republic of China based in Taipei
1975 Revision 1	4	China	(Note: Omitted entries.)	People's Republic of China based in Beijing
1982 Revision 2	3, 10, 18	China	(Note: Omitted entries.)	People's Republic of China based in Beijing
1996 Revision 3	4, 7, 11, 16, 23	China	Taiwan Province of China	People's Republic of China based in Beijing
1999 Revision 4	5, 11, 17, 37	China	Taiwan Province of China	People's Republic of China based in Beijing
Online version in lieu of prints	N/A	China		People's Republic of China based in Beijing

==== ISO 3166 ====
The Chinese and Taiwanese entries in the International Organization for Standardization's ISO 3166-1 country codes and ISO 3166-2:TW subdivision codes are as follows because its information source, the publication UN Terminology Bulletin-Country Names, lists Taiwan as "Taiwan, Province of China" due to the PRC's political influence in the United Nations as a member of the UN Security Council. Since the ISO 3166-1 code is commonly used as the data source for a complete list of country and territory names for computer programs and websites, "Taiwan, Province of China" is sometimes seen on dropdown menus instead of "Taiwan" for this reason.

Governing Authority	Short name upper case in ISO 3166	Short name lower case in ISO 3166	Full name in ISO 3166	Numeric code	Listed as independent in ISO 3166	Local short name	Language(s)	Links to ISO 3166-2
People's Republic of China	CHINA	China	the People's Republic of China	156	Yes	Zhongguo	Putonghua	ISO 3166-2:CN
Republic of China	TAIWAN, PROVINCE OF CHINA	Taiwan (Province of China)	(Note: Blank entries.)	158	No	Taiwan	Guoyu	ISO 3166-2:TW

==== Taiwanese reactions ====
The Guidelines for National Unification adopted in 1991 and abrogated in 2006 declared under "III. Principles":

1. Both the mainland and Taiwan areas are parts of Chinese territory. Helping to bring about national unification should be the common responsibility of all Chinese people.

In 2007, the Republic of China filed a lawsuit before a Swiss civil court against the ISO, arguing that the ISO's use of the United Nations name rather than "Republic of China (Taiwan)" violated Taiwan's name rights. On September 9, 2010, a panel of the Federal Supreme Court of Switzerland decided, by three votes to two, to dismiss the suit as presenting a political question not subject to Swiss civil jurisdiction. As of 2009, the Chinese and Taiwanese entries in CNS 12842 based on ISO 3166 with some differences are as follows with 11 columns meaning:

1	English short name upper case	CHINA	TAIWAN, ROC
2	Chinese full name	中華人民共和國	中華民國
3	English full name	the People's Republic of China	the Republic of China
4	Alpha-2 code	CN	TW
5	Alpha-3 code	CHN	TWN
6	Numeric code	156	158
7	Remark		"including Penghu Islands, Kinmen, and Matsu." (Note: 包括澎湖群島、金門、馬祖。)
8	Independent	#	#
9	Administrative language alpha-2	zh	zh
10	Administrative language alpha-3	zho	zho
11	Local short name	Zhongguo	TAIWAN, ROC

The Taipei-based government of the Republic of China encodes the subdivisions of Taiwan with some systems different from ISO 3166–2:TW:

- A national identification card has a unique number prefixed by an alphabet for a city or county.
- The three-digit postal codes in Taiwan usually encode townships and the equivalents.
- The national Code of Household Registration and Conscription Information System (HRCIS Code) covers more than Taiwanese subdivisions.

=== People's Republic of China ===
The term is often used in Chinese media whenever the word "Taiwan" is mentioned, as in news reports and in TV shows. Particularly, when Taiwanese entertainers are on talk shows or being interviewed, the Chinese subtitles on the TV screen would always say "Taiwan, China" (中国台湾 / 中國台灣) despite the fact the person never mentioned the word "China" (中国 / 中國). (It is standard practice for Chinese television to display subtitles in all programs.) Also, there has been controversy about Chinese talent shows forcing Taiwanese contestants to introduce themselves as from "Taiwan, China" or "Taipei, China". For example, Taiwanese singer Uni Yeh introduced herself as being from "Pingtung District, Taipei, China" (中国台北屏东区 /中國台北屏東區) (Note: ISO 3166–2:TW considered counties of Taiwan as "districts" before correcting the subdivision category on November 15, 2016.) on her first appearance on The Voice of China in 2013, despite Pingtung and Taipei being completely distinct areas on opposite sides of Taiwan, causing an uproar among Taiwanese netizens. Her response was that she was instructed to say so by the directors and was nervous.

In July 2017, the PRC's state news agency Xinhua issued a style guide stating that for geographical references, the region should be named "Taiwan Area" (台湾地区) or "Taiwan" and that it was 'generally now not called' "Taiwan Province". Its reason for doing so was ostensibly to "[take] into account the psychological feelings of Taiwanese." However, the style guide also asserts "Taiwan Area" and "Taiwan Province" as referring to different geographic boundaries, as "Taiwan Area" includes Kinmen and Matsu which the PRC claims as part of Fujian Province instead. For political references instead of geographic, the style guide prohibits all three of "Taiwan", "Taipei", and "Chinese Taipei" in favor of the PRC's preferred "Taiwan, China" or "Taipei, China". (The PRC only permits the term "Chinese Taipei" in the context of international organizations, such as the IOC and the WTO.) In addition, it stated that for publishing maps or statistics that include the mainland but exclude Taiwan to depict the People's Republic of China solely, any disclaimer should be explicitly labeled "Taiwan Province not included" with the word "province".

=== United States ===
If a place of birth on a United States passport application is written as "Taiwan, China", which cannot be shown in passports as per the One-China policy, the United States Department of State requires its officials to contact the applicant to ascertain whether "Taiwan" or "China" is the preferred place of birth to be printed.

=== Vietnam ===
In Vietnam, some government documents and some state media may use the forms Đài Loan (Trung Quốc) ["Taiwan (China)"] or Đài Loan, Trung Quốc ("Taiwan, China") to refer to Taiwan or Republic of China in contexts such as music and entertainment coverage. In other media, they often use the term vùng lãnh thổ ("territory") or đảo ("island") to refer to Taiwan when wanting to avoid repeating the term "Taiwan" many times in their article. The term Tỉnh Đài Loan ("Taiwan Province") sometimes appear in media to refer to all of "Taiwan Area" (not only referring to the Taiwan Province of ROC). "Đài Loan" remains the official name of Taiwan in Vietnamese in most cases.

=== International airlines ===
In April 2018, the Civil Aviation Administration of China (CAAC) wrote a letter to approximately 36 airlines throughout the world, including American Airlines, Air Canada, All Nippon Airways, Air New Zealand, British Airways, Delta Air Lines, Japan Airlines, Lufthansa, Qantas, Singapore Airlines, and United Airlines, among others, requesting that they change travel destination cities in Taiwan on their websites to list them under "Taiwan, Province of China", or directly list them as, for example, "Taipei, China" and "Kaohsiung, China" instead of the existing "Taipei, Taiwan" and "Kaohsiung, Taiwan". The request was made under the possibility that if the demands were not met, the airlines could be banned from flying into China or along its airspace. In 2026, Philippines-based low-cost airline Cebu Pacific had updated its designation of Taiwan into "Taiwan (China)" in their websites.

Most airlines quickly complied, although there was some initial resistance among some U.S. airlines. They requested a time extension to consider the issue, and replied to the Authority that they will confer with the U.S. government regarding the course of action. The White House under the Trump administration responded by labeling the move as "Orwellian nonsense". The CAAC therefore extended the deadline for U.S. airlines to July 25, 2018 for compliance. Eventually, all of the resisting U.S. airlines partially gave in to Beijing's demand by the deadline, and dropped all references to Taiwan as a country, but rather listing the city names only (for example, just "Taipei" or "Kaohsiung" without any mention of which country the city is in).

== See also ==
- Taiwan (People's Republic of China province)
- Cross-Strait relations
- Outline of Taiwan
- Political status of Taiwan
- Taiwan independence movement
- United Nations General Assembly Resolution 2758
