= Japanese input method =

Methods used to input Japanese characters on a computer

Standard JIS layout used by most keyboards sold in Japan.

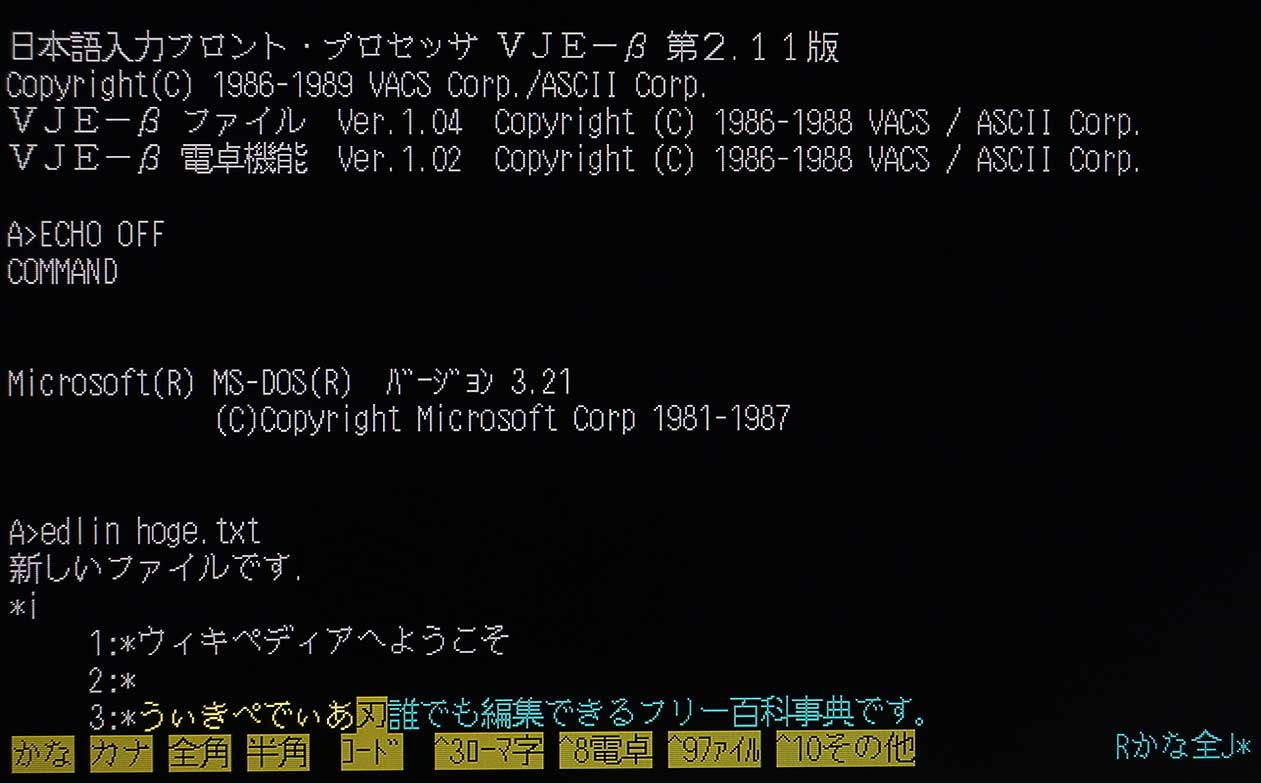
VJE Japanese input method for MS-DOS

Japanese input methods are used to input Japanese characters on a computer.

There are two main methods of inputting Japanese on computers. One is via a romanized version of Japanese called rōmaji (literally "Roman character"), and the other is via keyboard keys corresponding to the Japanese kana. Some systems may also work via a graphical user interface, or GUI, where the characters are chosen by clicking on buttons or image maps.

== Japanese keyboards ==
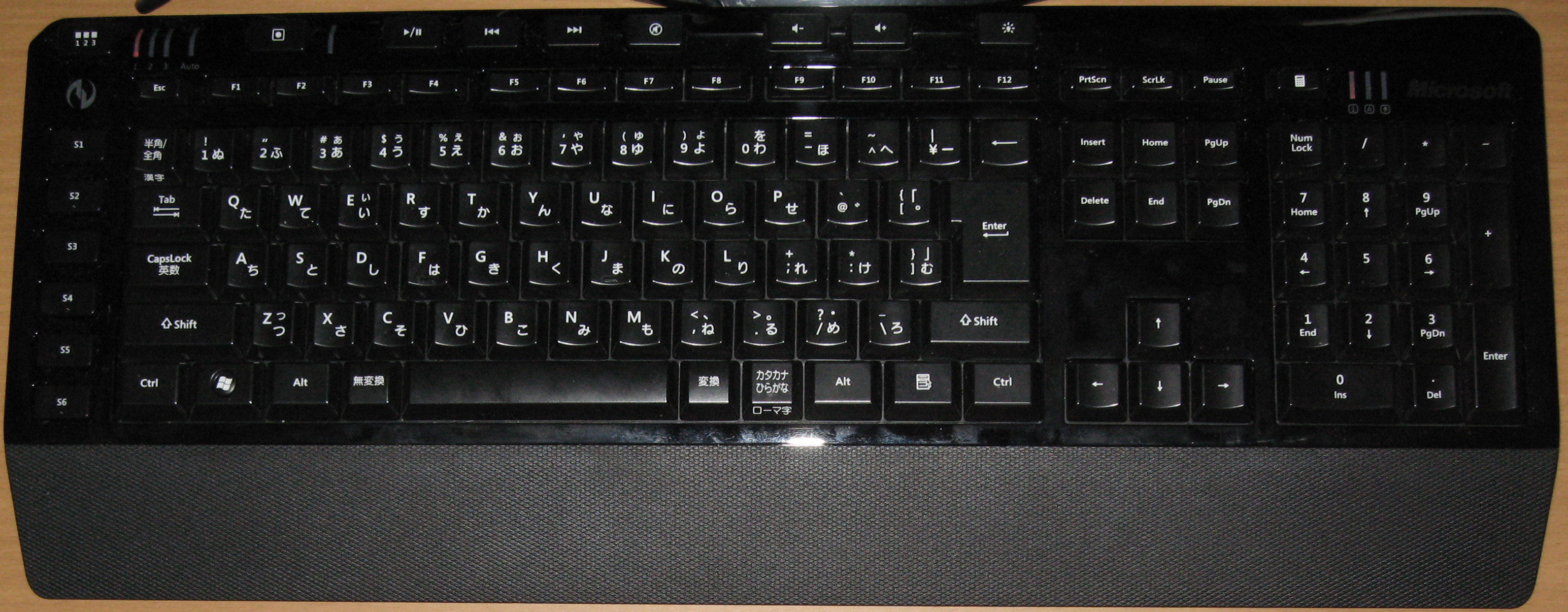
Microsoft's gaming keyboard for the Japanese market

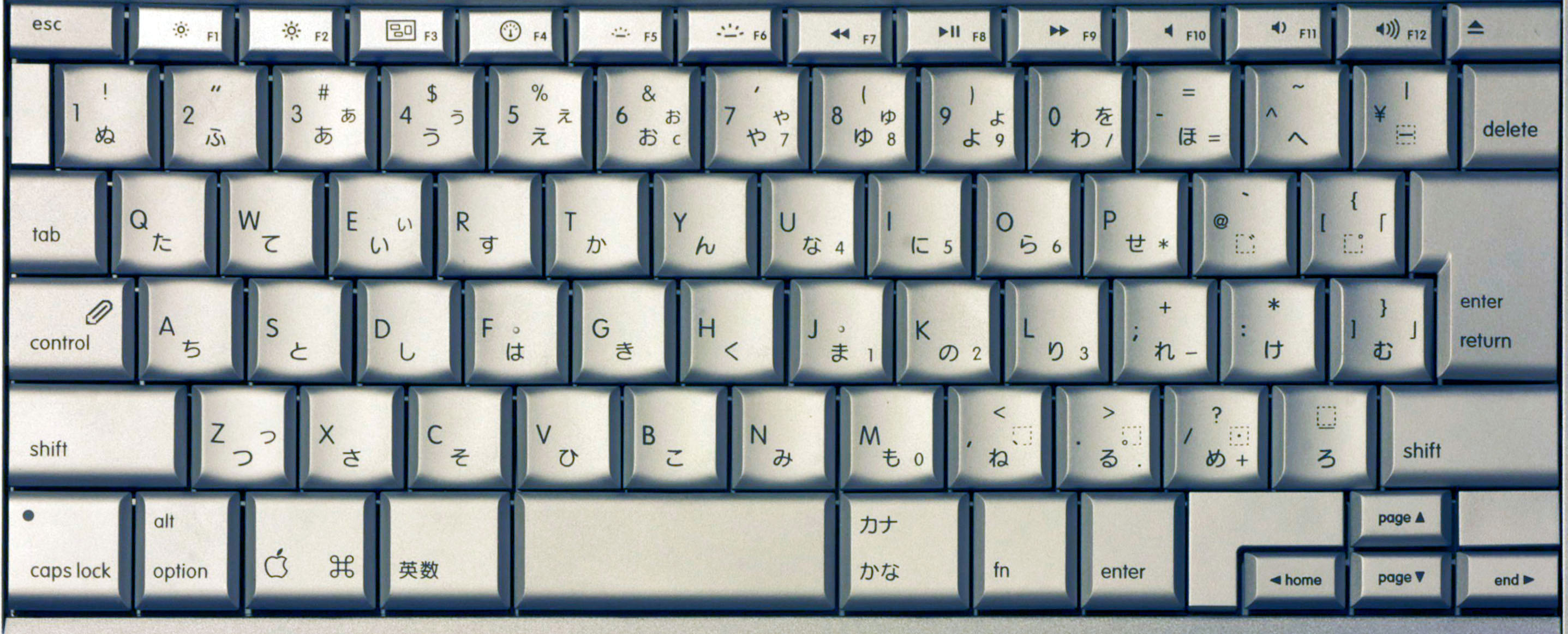
Apple MacBook Pro Japanese Keyboard

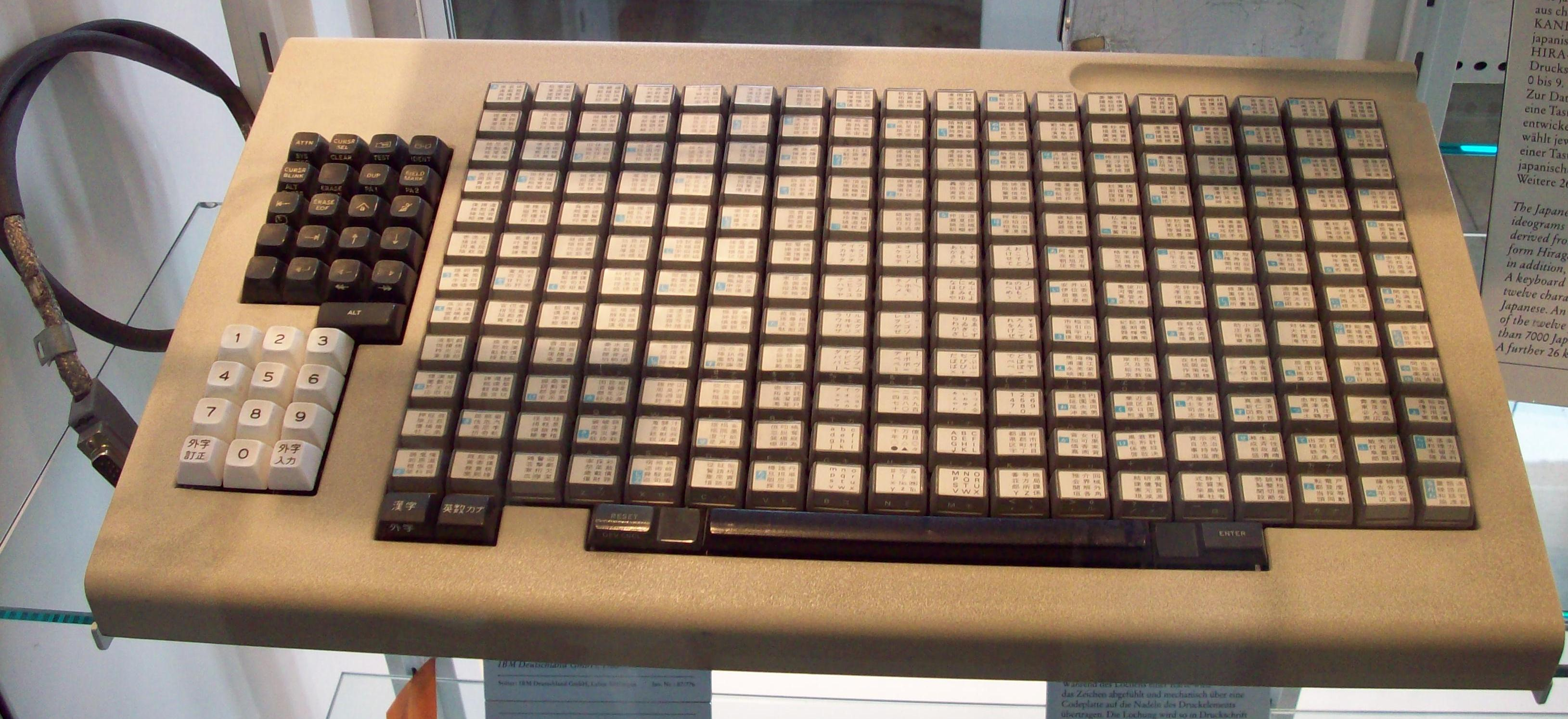
70s Kanji keyboard (a subsystem common to the IBM 3278 Model 52 Display and the IBM 5924-T01 Kanji Keypunch) used before the Kana-to-Kanji conversion was invented

Japanese keyboards (as shown on the second image) have both hiragana and Roman letters indicated. The JIS, or Japanese Industrial Standard, keyboard layout keeps the Roman letters in the English QWERTY layout, with numbers above them. Many of the non-alphanumeric symbols are the same as on English-language keyboards, but some symbols are located in other places. The hiragana symbols are also ordered in a consistent way across different keyboards. For example, the Q, W, E, R, T, Y keys correspond to た, て, い, す, か, ん (ta, te, i, su, ka, and n) respectively when the computer is used for direct hiragana input.

=== Input keys ===
Since Japanese input requires switching between Roman and hiragana entry modes, and also conversion between hiragana and kanji (as discussed below), there are usually several special keys on the keyboard. This varies from computer to computer, and some OS vendors have striven to provide a consistent user interface regardless of the type of keyboard being used. On non-Japanese keyboards, option- or control- key sequences can perform all of the tasks mentioned below.

On most Japanese keyboards, one key switches between Roman characters and Japanese characters. Sometimes, each mode (Roman and Japanese) may even have its own key, in order to prevent ambiguity when the user is typing quickly.

There may also be a key to instruct the computer to convert the latest hiragana characters into kanji, although usually the space key serves the same purpose since Japanese writing doesn't use spaces.

Keyboards with multiple forms of writing may have a mode key to switch between them. Hiragana, katakana, halfwidth katakana, halfwidth Roman letters, and fullwidth Roman letters are some of the options. A typical Japanese character is square while Roman characters are typically variable in width. Since all Japanese characters occupy the space of a square box, it is sometimes desirable to input Roman characters in the same square form in order to preserve the grid layout of the text. These Roman characters that have been fitted to a square character cell are called fullwidth, while the normal ones are called halfwidth. In some fonts these are fitted to half-squares, like some monospaced fonts, while in others they are not. Often, fonts are available in two variants, one with the halfwidth characters monospaced, and another one with proportional halfwidth characters. The name of the typeface with proportional halfwidth characters is often prefixed with "P" for "proportional".

Finally, a keyboard may have a special key to tell the OS that the last kana entered should not be converted to kanji. Sometimes this is just the Return/Enter key.

In Microsoft Windows platforms, changing a physical keyboard from an English US keyboard (101 keys) to Japanese keyboard (106 keys) or vice versa may require modifying the registry to ensure symbols like @ can be inputted correctly.

=== Thumb-shift keyboards ===
A thumb-shift keyboard is an alternative design, popular among professional Japanese typists. Like a standard Japanese keyboard, it has hiragana characters marked in addition to Latin letters, but the layout is completely different. Most letter keys have two kana characters associated with them, which allows all the characters to fit in three rows, like in Western layouts. In the place of the space bar key on a conventional keyboard, there are two additional modifier keys, operated with thumbs - one of them is used to enter the alternate character marked, and the other is used for voiced sounds. The semi-voiced sounds are entered using either the conventional shift key operated by the little finger, or take place of the voiced sound for characters not having a voiced variant.

The kana-to-kanji conversion is done in the same way as when using any other type of keyboard. There are dedicated conversion keys on some designs, while on others the thumb shift keys double as such.

== Rōmaji input ==
As an alternative to direct input of kana, a number of Japanese input method editors allow Japanese text to be entered using rōmaji, which can then be converted to kana or kanji. This method does not require the use of a Japanese keyboard with kana markings.

== Mobile phones ==
=== Keitai input ===
Japanese mobile phone keypad (Model Samsung 708SC)

The primary system used to input Japanese on earlier generations of mobile phones is based on the numerical keypad. Each number is associated with a particular sequence of kana, such as ka, ki, ku, ke, ko for '2', and the button is pressed repeatedly to get the correct kana—each key corresponds to a column in the gojūon (5 row × 10 column grid of kana), while the number of presses determines the row. Dakuten and handakuten marks, punctuation, and other symbols can be added by other buttons in the same way. Kana to kanji conversion is done via the arrow and other keys.

=== Flick input ===
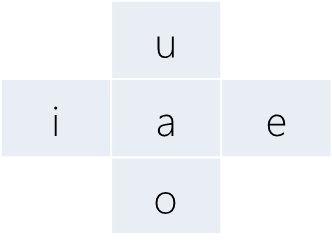
Flick input

Flick input is a Japanese input method used on smartphones. The key layout is the same as the Keitai input, but rather than pressing a key repeatedly, the user can swipe from the key in a certain direction to produce the desired character. Japanese smartphone IMEs such as Google Japanese Input, POBox and S-Shoin all support flick input.

==== Godan layout ====
In addition to the industry standard QWERTY and 12 key layouts, Google Japanese Input offers a 15-key Godan keyboard layout, which is an alphabet layout optimized for romaji input. The letters fit in a five rows by three columns grid. The left column consists of the five vowels, in the same order as the columns in the Gojūon table (a, i, u, e, o), while the central and right column consists of letters for the nine main voiceless consonants of kanas, in the same order as the rows in the Gojūon table (k, s, t, n, [special]; h, m, y, r, w). Other characters are typed by flick gesture:

- The other twelve Latin consonants not needed for composing kanas (b, c, d, f, g, j, l, p, q, v, x, z) are composed on the voiceless consonants by swiping them up, or right, or even left (swiping k for q or g; swiping s for j or z; swiping t for c or d; swiping h for f, b or p; swiping m for l; swiping y for x; swiping w for v).
- The main voiced kanas are composed like in romaji, by typing (without swiping) the voiceless consonant on the two last columns, then swiping the vowel on the first column.
- The other voiced kanas letters (with handakuon or small forms) are composed by typing the voiceless consonant, then swiping the vowel, then swiping the [special] key (in the middle of the last row) to select the handakuon (swipe to the left or right) or small kana forms (swipe up).
- Small kana can be written by swiping to l or x, and then writing the wanted letter, e.g. inputs fa and hu/fu, then la/xa both give out ふぁ/ファ fa, as in ファミコン Famikon.
- Decimal digits are composed by swiping down the keys located on the first 3 rows (digits 1 to 9) or the middle of the fourth row (digit 0).
- The four main punctuation signs are composed by swiping r at end of the fourth row (swipe down for comma, left for the full stop, up for the question mark, right for the exclamation mark).
- Other signs or input controls may be composed by typing or swiping the other unused positions of other keys. But the tactile version of the layout adds keys in two additional columns for typing space, Enter, Backspace, moving the input cursor to the left or right, converting the previous character between hiragana and katakana, and selecting other input modes.
- Writing just c gives out か・く・こ when written with a, u and o respectively, and し・せ when with i and e, respectively.
- To write a sokuon before ち, the inputs WITH this character are: lt(s)u/xt(s)u, ti/chi. The input tchi doesn't work.
- [Special] consists of ゛, ゜ and 小 (dakuten, handakuten, small).

Unlike the 12-key input, repeating a key in Godan is not interpreted as a gesture to cycle through kana with different vowels, but rather it would be interpreted as a repeated romaji letter behaving the same as in the QWERTY layout mode.

Japanese keyboard layout and input comparison chart
Layout	Desktop	Keitai	Smart phone	Cycling input	Flick input	Romaji input
12 key	No	Yes	Yes	Yes	Yes	No
QWERTY	Yes	No	Yes	No	No	Yes
Godan	No	No	Yes	No	Yes	Yes

== Other ==
Other consumer devices in Japan which allow for text entry via on-screen programming, such as digital video recorders and video game consoles, allow the user to toggle between the numerical keypad and a full keyboard (QWERTY, or ABC order) input system.

== Kana to kanji conversion ==
After the kana have been input, they are either left as they are, or converted into kanji (Chinese characters). The Japanese language has many homophones, and conversion of a kana spelling (representing the pronunciation) into a kanji (representing the standard written form of the word) is often a one-to-many process. The kana to kanji converter offers a list of candidate kanji writings for the input kana, and the user may use the space bar or arrow keys to scroll through the list of candidates until they reach the correct writing. On reaching the correct written form, pressing the Enter key, or sometimes the "henkan" key, ends the conversion process. This selection can also be controlled through the GUI with a mouse or other pointing device.

If the hiragana is required, pressing the Enter key immediately after the characters are entered will end the conversion process and results in the hiragana as typed. If katakana is required, it is usually presented as an option along with the kanji choices. Alternatively, on some keyboards, pressing the muhenkan (無変換; "no conversion") button switches between katakana and hiragana.

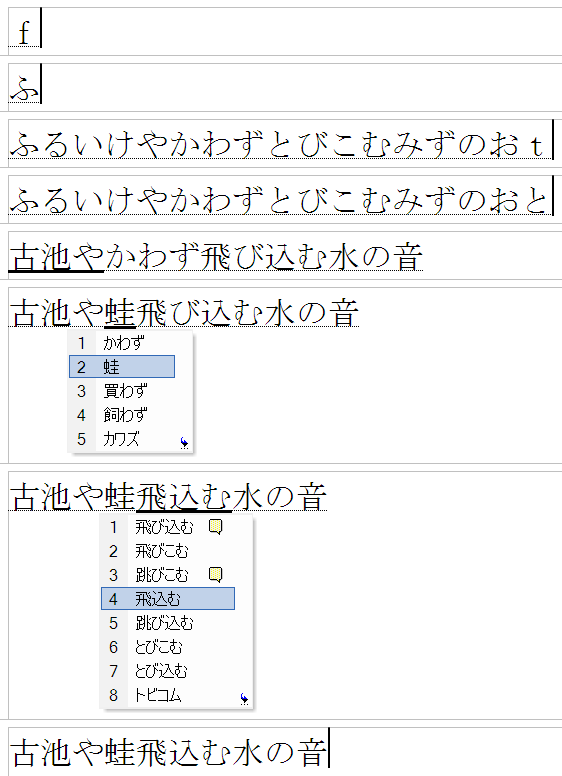
Operation of a typical IME

Sophisticated kana to kanji converters (known collectively as input method editors, or IMEs), allow conversion of multiple kana words into kanji at once, freeing the user from having to do a conversion at each stage. The user can convert at any stage of input by pressing the space bar or henkan button, and the converter attempts to guess the correct division of words. Some IME programs display a brief definition of each word in order to help the user choose the correct kanji.

Sometimes the kana to kanji converter may guess the correct kanji for all the words, but if it does not, the cursor (arrow) keys may be used to move backwards and forwards between candidate words, or digit keys can be used to select one of them directly (without pressing cursor keys multiple times and pressing Enter to confirm the choice). If the selected word boundaries are incorrect, the word boundaries can be moved using the control key (or shift key, e.g. on iBus-Anthy) plus the arrow keys.

=== Learning systems ===
Modern systems learn the user's preferences for conversion and put the most recently selected candidates at the top of the conversion list, and also remember which words the user is likely to use when considering word boundaries.

==== Predictive systems ====
The systems used on mobile phones go even further, and try to guess entire phrases or sentences. After a few kana have been entered, the phone automatically offers entire phrases or sentences as possible completion candidates, jumping beyond what has been input. This is usually based on words sent in previous messages.

== See also ==
- Japanese language and computers
- Japanese typewriter
- List of input methods for Unix platforms
- Wāpuro rōmaji
- Wabun Code – Japanese Morse code
- List of CJK fonts
- Chinese input methods for computers
- Wnn
- Kotoeri
- ATOK
- Google Japanese Input
- Arabic keyboard
