= Mainland Chinese students in Taiwan =

Mainland Chinese students in Taiwan refers to the policy, coordinated by the governments of the People's Republic of China and the Republic of China (Taiwan), allowing students from mainland China to pursue education in Taiwan. The policy also included related measures such as the recognition of academic qualifications from mainland China and was formally implemented in 2011.

== History ==
Debates over whether Taiwan should recognize academic credentials from mainland China and permit mainland Chinese students to study in Taiwan lasted for fifteen years and involved eight ministers of education(Taiwan). Legislators from both the ruling and opposition parties in the Legislative Yuan engaged in multiple physical altercations over the issue.

In 2014, Liu Chi-liang became the first mainland Chinese student to receive a doctoral degree in Taiwan, graduating from the Graduate Institute of China and Asia-Pacific Studies at National Sun Yat-sen University

On 9 April 2020, the Ministry of Education of the People's Republic of China announced that, "after considering the COVID-19 pandemic and the Cross-strait relations, it has been decided to suspend the enrollment of mainland graduates at all educational levels to institutions in Taiwan for 2020. Mainland students already studying at Taiwanese universities who wish to continue their studies in Taiwan may do so voluntarily."

== Admissions ==
Beginning in 2011, the Republic of China government allowed students from mainland China (commonly referred to as Mainland students, excluding those from Hong Kong and Macau) to apply to Taiwanese colleges and universities. Private universities were permitted to enroll mainland students in undergraduate education and graduate programs, while national universities were initially allowed to recruit only graduate students, with the exceptions of National Penghu University of Science and Technology and National Quemoy University.

In 2014, the Ministry of Education(Taiwan) further opened undergraduate programs at national universities to mainland Chinese students, with each institution limited to five admissions. This policy significantly increased the number of applicants that year.

Enrollment figures for the second round of graduate admissions are shown in the table below.

Applications to Graduate Programs (Second Admission Cycle)
Rank	University	Applicants in 2012	Applicants in 2011
1	National Taiwan University	716	473
2	National Chengchi University	378	253
3	National Tsing Hua University	213	233
4	National Cheng Kung University	201	147
5	National Chiao Tung University	155	148
6	Fu Jen Catholic University	130	N/A
7	National Central University	93	Approximately 90
8	National Sun Yat-sen University	78	Approximately 100
9	National Taiwan University of Science and Technology	77	Approximately 80
10	National Taipei University of Technology	62	Approximately 70

Mainland Chinese Student Enrollment by Year
Year	Admission Quota	Applicants	Reported Enrollment	Registered Students
2011	2,141	1,905	975	928
2012	2,141	2,629	987	951
2013	3,805	2,838	1,958	1,822
2014	4,700	4,550	2,734	2,553
2015	4,700	5,094	3,238	3,019

== Policy ==
Amendments to laws related to Mainland Chinese students studying in Taiwan, including the Act Governing Relations between the People of the Taiwan Area and the Mainland Area, the University Act, and the Junior College Act, were passed by the Legislative Yuan in the third reading (legislature) on 19 August 2010 and came into effect in 2011.

=== Restrictions and Liberalization ===
==== Three Restrictions and Six Prohibitions ====
Taiwan adopted the principle of the "Three Restrictions and Six Prohibitions" (三限六不) for Mainland Chinese students studying in Taiwan.

Three Restrictions

- Restriction on the recognition of higher education qualifications.
- Restriction on the total number of Mainland Chinese students admitted to Taiwan.
- Restriction on the fields whose qualifications are recognized.

Six Prohibitions

- No preferential treatment or bonus points in admissions.
- No reduction in admission opportunities for domestic students.
- No government scholarships or financial aid.
- No part-time job while studying.
- No employment in Taiwan.
- No eligibility to take civil service or professional licensing examinations.

==== One Restriction and Two Prohibitions ====
Following cross-party negotiations in the Legislative Yuan, one restriction and two prohibitions were formally enacted:

- Restriction on the recognition of medical qualifications.
- Prohibition on part-time work.
- Prohibition on taking national examinations.

==== Relaxation of University Recognition ====
In 2011, Taiwan recognized degrees from only 41 universities in mainland China (2011–2012). The number was later expanded to 111 institutions in 2013 and 129 in 2014. To accommodate the admission of graduates from Mainland Chinese junior colleges into two-year bachelor's programs beginning in 2013, Taiwan announced on 2 May 2013 that it would recognize qualifications from 191 junior colleges in mainland China.

==== Relaxation of Enrollment Quotas ====
The admission quota for Mainland Chinese students was initially limited to 1% of total enrollment (approximately 2,850 students). It was later expanded to 2% (approximately 5,700 students).

==== Employment Restrictions ====
Mainland Chinese students were originally prohibited from working in Taiwan. However, in January 2014, the Ministry of Education(Taiwan) ruled that they could serve as research assistants or teaching assistants and receive hourly pay if the work formed part of coursework, thesis research, or graduation requirements. Off-campus employment remained prohibited.

On 22 January 2014, the Ministry of Education (Taiwan) further clarified that degree-seeking Mainland Chinese students could serve as research or teaching assistants under the category of "course learning". This category included:

- Activities that are part of coursework, thesis research, or graduation requirements.
- Internships, field studies, laboratory research, or other learning activities established under the autonomy granted by the University Act and the Junior College Act.
- Requirements that apply equally to domestic students, foreign students, overseas Chinese students, Hong Kong and Macau students, and students from mainland China.
- Positions involving no labor or employment beyond educational activities.

==== Gradual Liberalization ====
On 8 June 2015, Deputy Minister of Education Chen Te-hua stated that the government would gradually relax the "Three Restrictions and Six Prohibitions" policy, retaining only two principles: prohibiting Mainland Chinese graduates from remaining in Taiwan for employment and continuing the non-recognition of Mainland Chinese medical qualifications.

The Kuomintang had not yet announced an official position, while the Democratic Progressive Party caucus and the Taiwan Solidarity Union caucus opposed the move. They argued that the "Three Restrictions and Six Prohibitions" policy had been adopted in 2011 as a compromise to protect the rights of Taiwanese students while allowing recognition of Mainland Chinese academic credentials. Relaxing the policy through administrative orders to attract more Mainland Chinese students, they contended, reflected inconsistency in Taiwan's education policy and failed to address the competitiveness of Taiwanese students.

== Health Insurance Issues ==
Mainland Chinese students studying in Taiwan are currently eligible for private health insurance, although the coverage provided is less comprehensive than that offered by the National Health Insurance (NHI) system. The availability of health insurance has become an important factor influencing Mainland Chinese students' decisions to study in Taiwan. From humanitarian and human rights perspectives, the government of the Republic of China decided to include Mainland Chinese students in the National Health Insurance system and provide them with treatment equal to that of foreign and overseas Chinese students.

=== Related Legislation ===
==== Act Governing Relations between the People of the Taiwan Area and the Mainland Area ====
Under Taiwan's National Health Insurance Act, foreign residents are eligible to enroll in National Health Insurance only if they possess a residence permit. To allow Mainland Chinese students studying in Taiwan to enroll in NHI under the same conditions as foreign students residing in Taiwan, the Executive Yuan proposed amendments to Article 22 of the Act Governing Relations between the People of the Taiwan Area and the Mainland Area, changing the status of Mainland Chinese students from "period of stay" to "period of residence" in accordance with NHI regulations.

The amendment bill was submitted to the Legislative Yuan on 17 October 2012 and referred to the Internal Administration, Education, and Culture Committee on 28 December. On 24 September 2014, the committee completed its review and adopted three supplementary resolutions, forwarding the bill for cross-party negotiations.

On 24 October 2016, President Tsai Ing-wen convened a ruling-party policy coordination meeting to discuss the inclusion of Mainland Chinese students in the NHI system. It was decided that Mainland Chinese students studying in Taiwan would be covered by National Health Insurance. However, due to limited government resources, overseas Chinese students, foreign students, and Mainland Chinese students would be required to pay the full insurance premium themselves, with no government subsidy. Government agencies wishing to assist economically disadvantaged students would need to allocate separate funding.

==== National Health Insurance Act ====
The government advocated extending National Health Insurance coverage to Mainland Chinese students on the same basis as overseas Chinese and foreign students, with students paying the full premium themselves. Article 1 of the Act Governing Relations between the People of the Taiwan Area and the Mainland Area stipulates that matters not covered by the Act are governed by other applicable laws. As a framework law, it cannot encompass all cross-strait affairs. According to statistics from the Mainland Affairs Council, more than 53 laws and over 80 provisions regulate cross-strait interactions.

Since the National Health Insurance Act governs eligibility and premium calculations, amending that law was considered more conducive to administrative implementation. Amendments to the NHI Act were reviewed by the Legislative Yuan's Social Welfare and Environmental Hygiene Committee on 7 and 19 December 2016. Proposed amendments from the Democratic Progressive Party and the People First Party were sent for cross-party negotiations. Negotiations held on 21 March 2017 failed to reach consensus, and the matter was referred to the Legislative Yuan president. Although scheduled for discussion on 28 April and 2 May 2017, the bill did not proceed to substantive review.

Beginning in 2012, the government sought to include degree-seeking Mainland Chinese students covered under the Regulations Governing Mainland Area People Studying in Junior Colleges and Above in Taiwan within the National Health Insurance system. Exchange and visiting students admitted under the Regulations Governing Permission for People from the Mainland Area to Enter the Taiwan Area were generally excluded because they stayed in Taiwan for short periods, usually less than six months. The government stated that the possibility of extending coverage to exchange students staying longer than six months would be evaluated according to the principles of gradual implementation, periodic review, and comprehensive supporting measures, while taking into account the overall status of the NHI system and public opinion.

=== Other Countries ===
Countries with comprehensive national health insurance systems, such as the United Kingdom's National Health Service (NHS) and Japan's National Health Insurance system, require international students staying for six months or more to enroll and share medical risks with the general population. Countries that primarily rely on private health insurance, such as the United States, also require international students to possess health insurance in order to register.

Given limited resources and considerations of fairness in social insurance, the government planned that overseas Chinese students and foreign students would also pay the full insurance premium after the law was amended, although the rights of those already studying in Taiwan before the amendment would remain unaffected.

== Related Incidents ==
Mainland Chinese student Chen Yuzhen from Anhui Province returned to China after completing an exchange program at Aletheia University. He continued to Internet censorship circumvention, publicly criticized China's COVID-19 policies on social media, and provided circumvention techniques to churches. He was subsequently arrested in Sanya, Hainan Province, and charged with inciting subversion of state power and providing programs and tools for illegally accessing and controlling computer information systems.

Mainland Chinese student Li Jiabao from Shandong Province studied at Chia Nan University of Pharmacy and Science as an exchange student. On 11 March 2019, after livestreaming criticism of Xi Jinping on Twitter, he sought political asylum.

== Opposition ==
According to media reports, in early August 2017, authorities in Fujian Province instructed high schools to require class advisers to personally inform each student admitted to Taiwanese universities that "the current cross-strait situation is severe, complex, and sensitive, and students should carefully reconsider studying at universities in Taiwan." As a supporting measure, the Fujian Provincial Education Examinations Authority extended the deadline for supplementary university applications until noon on 4 August.
