= Kotoeri =

Discontinued Japanese-language input method

- Developer: Apple Inc.
- Final release: 4.4.0 / October 22, 2013
- Operating system: Classic Mac OS, OS X
- Platform: x86
- Type: Input method
- License: Proprietary

Kotoeri (ことえり) is a discontinued Japanese-language input method that came standard with OS X and earlier versions of Classic Mac OS until OS X Yosemite. Kotoeri (written ことえり or 言選り) literally means "word selection".

== Overview ==
The name "Kotoeri" comes from the chapter of Hahakigi in Tale of Genji: "Even though I write a letter, I must carefully choose my words (文を書けど、おほどかに言選りをし, fumi o kake do, ohodoka ni kotoeri o shi)".

In version 4, Kotoeri added support for Ainu, colloquial language and Kansai dialect input, the ability to search for kanji among related characters using keyboard shortcuts, and the option to use key bindings similar to Microsoft IME. Additionally, it allowed converting accidentally typed kana into romanized letters by pressing the 英数 (alphanumeric) key twice and reverting confirmed characters to their original state by pressing the かな (kana) key twice.

Kotoeri supported key shortcuts including, for example, control+J to convert to Hiragana and control+K to convert to Katakana. For users who are accustomed to the initial version of Kotoeri, the assigned shortcuts can still be used effectively. Specifically, ⌥ Option+Z shortcut can be used to convert text to Hiragana, while ⌥ Option+X shortcut allows for conversion to Katakana. These features ensure a seamless transition even for those familiar with the original version's shortcuts.

Starting from OS X Yosemite (OS X version 10.10), which was released on October 16, 2014, Kotoeri was entirely replaced with a different Japanese input method program.

== See also ==
- Japanese input methods
- Japanese language and computers
- Keyboard layout#Japanese
