= Japanese language and computers =

A Japanese kana keyboard

In relation to the Japanese language and computers, many adaptation issues arise, some unique to Japanese and others common to languages that have a very large number of characters. The number of characters needed in order to write in English is quite small, and thus it is possible to use only one byte (2^{8}=256 possible values) to encode each English character. However, the number of characters in Japanese is many more than 256 and thus cannot be encoded using a single byte; Japanese is thus encoded using two or more bytes, in a so-called "double byte" or "multi-byte" encoding. Problems that arise relate to transliteration and romanization, character encoding, and input of Japanese text.

== Character encodings ==
There are several standard methods to encode Japanese characters for use on a computer, including JIS, Shift-JIS, EUC, and Unicode. While mapping the set of kana is a simple matter, kanji has proven more difficult. Despite efforts, none of the encoding schemes have become the de facto standard, and multiple encoding standards were in use by the 2000s. As of 2017, the share of UTF-8 traffic on the Internet had expanded to over 90% worldwide, with only 1.2% still using Shift-JIS and EUC. Yet, a few popular websites, including 2channel and kakaku.com, are still using Shift-JIS.

Until the 2000s, most Japanese emails were in ISO-2022-JP ("JIS encoding") and web pages in Shift-JIS, and mobile phones in Japan usually used some form of Extended Unix Code. If a program fails to determine the encoding scheme employed, it can cause mojibake (文字化け, "misconverted garbled/garbage characters"; literally "transformed characters") and thus unreadable text on computers.

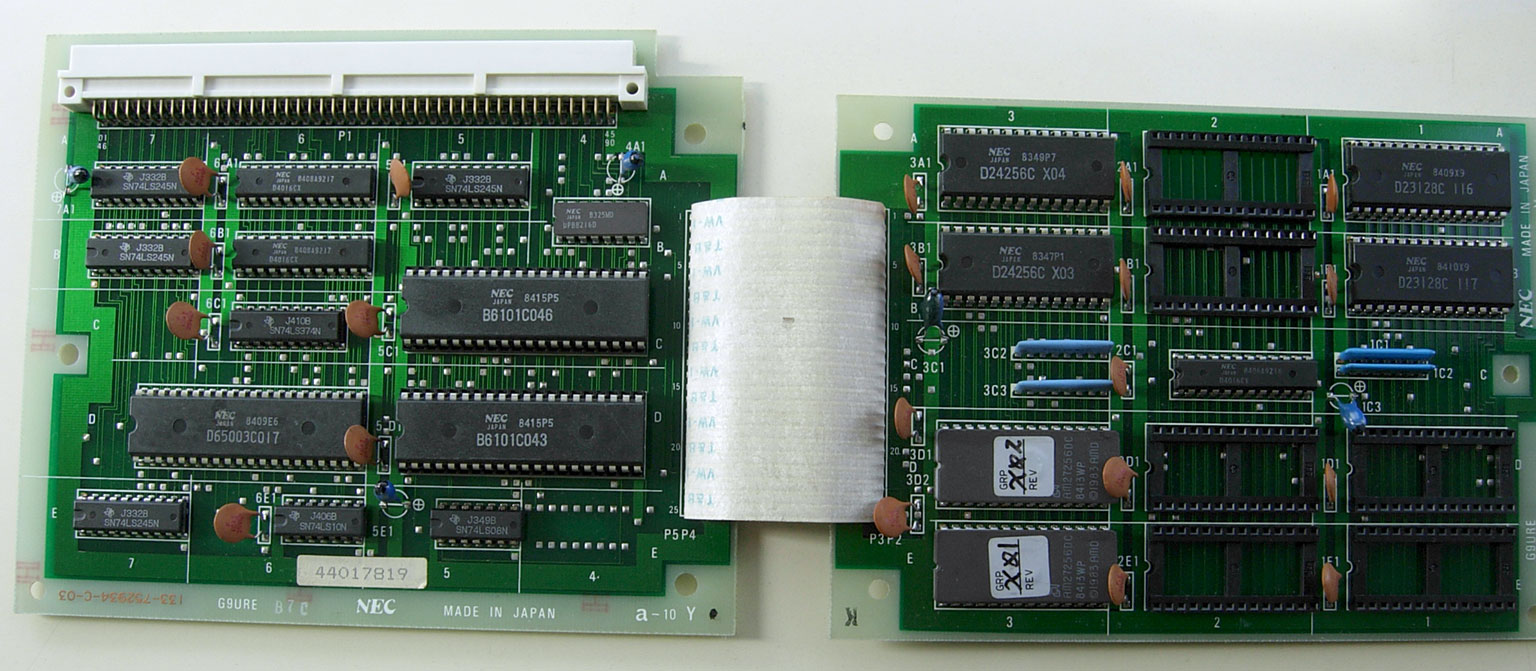
A Kanji ROM card installed in a PC-98, which stored about 3000 glyphs and enabled quick display. It also had a RAM to store gaiji.

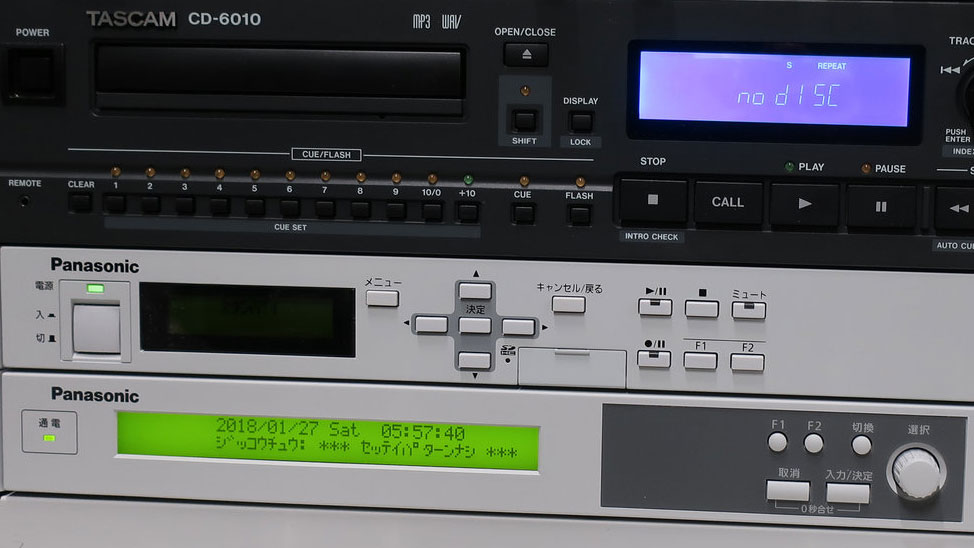
Embedded devices are still using half-width kana.

The first encoding to become widely used was JIS X 0201, a single-byte encoding that covers standard 7-bit ASCII characters with half-width katakana extensions. This was widely used in systems that were neither powerful enough nor had the storage to handle kanji (including old embedded equipment such as cash registers) because Kana-Kanji conversion required a complicated process, and output in kanji required much memory and high resolution. This means that only katakana, not kanji, was supported using this technique. Some embedded displays still have this limitation.

The development of kanji encodings was the beginning of the split. Shift JIS supports kanji and was developed to be completely backward compatible with JIS X 0201, and thus is widely embedded in electronic equipment. However, Shift JIS has the unfortunate property that it often breaks any parser (software that reads the coded text) that is not specifically designed to handle it.

For example, some Shift-JIS characters include a backslash (0x5C "\") in the second byte, which is used as an escape character in many programming languages.

構		わ		な		い	
8d	5c	82	ed	82	c8	82	a2

A parser lacking support for Shift JIS will recognize 0x5C 0x82 as an invalid escape sequence and remove it. Therefore, the phrase causes mojibake.

高		墲		ﾈ	い	
8d	82	ed	82	c8	82	a2

This can happen, for example, in the C programming language when having Shift-JIS in text strings. It does not happen in HTML since ASCII 0x00–0x3F (which includes ", %, &, and some other used escape characters and string separators) do not appear as the second byte in Shift-JIS, and backslash is not an escape character there. However, it can happen for JavaScript, which can be embedded in HTML pages.

EUC, on the other hand, is handled much better by parsers that have been written for 7-bit ASCII (and thus EUC encodings are used on UNIX, where much of the file-handling code was historically only written for English encodings). But EUC is not backwards compatible with JIS X 0201, the first main Japanese encoding. Further complications arise because the original Internet e-mail standards only support 7-bit transfer protocols. Thus, RFC 1468 ("ISO-2022-JP", often simply referred to as JIS encoding) was developed for sending and receiving emails.

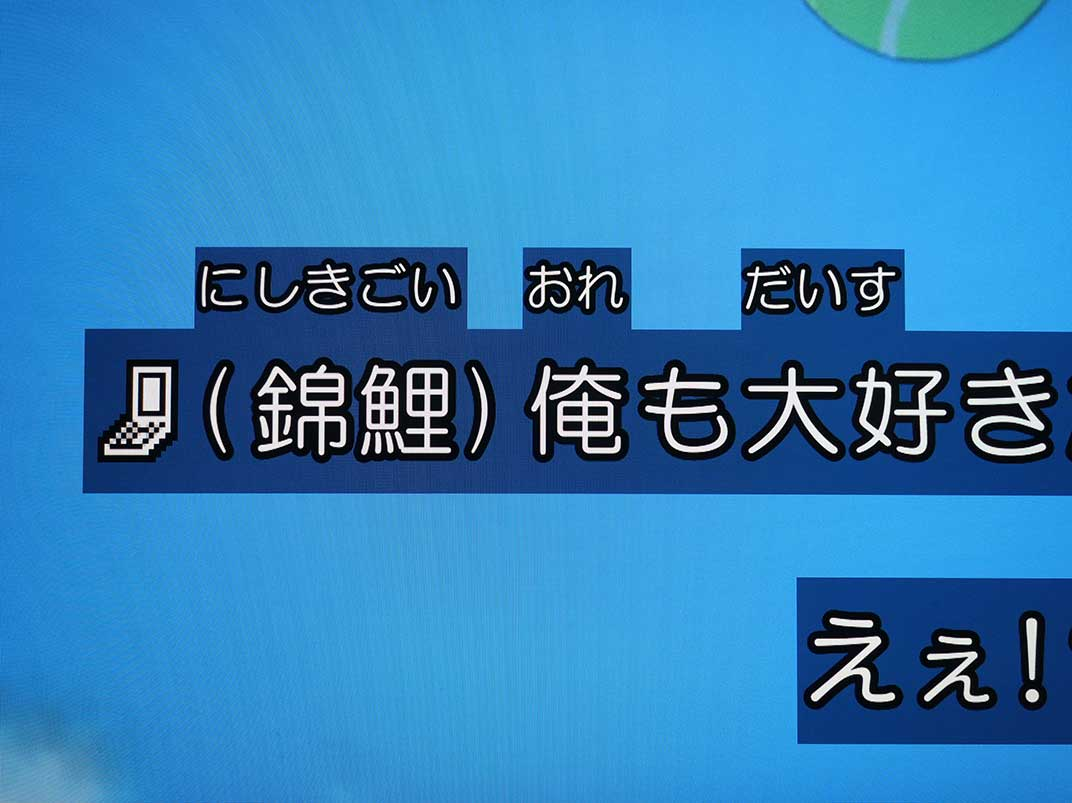
Gaiji is used in the closed caption of Japanese TV broadcasting.

In character set standards such as JIS, not all required characters are included, so gaiji (外字 "external characters") are sometimes used to supplement the character set. Gaiji may come in the form of external font packs, where normal characters have been replaced with new characters, or the new characters have been added to unused character positions. However, gaiji are not practical in Internet environments since the font set must be transferred with the text to use the gaiji. As a result, such characters are written with similar or simpler characters in place, or the text may need to be encoded using a larger character set (such as Unicode) that supports the required character.

Unicode was intended to solve all encoding problems for all languages. The UTF-8 encoding used to encode Unicode in web pages does not have the disadvantages that Shift-JIS has. Unicode is supported by international software, eliminating the need for gaiji. There are still controversies, however. For Japanese, the kanji characters have been unified with Chinese; that is, a character considered to be the same in both Japanese and Chinese is given a single number, even if the appearance is actually somewhat different, with the precise appearance left to the use of a locale-appropriate font. This process, called Han unification, has caused controversy. The previous encodings in Japan, the Taiwan Area, Mainland China, and Korea have only handled one language, and Unicode should handle all. The handling of Kanji/Chinese has, however, been designed by a committee composed of representatives from all four countries/areas.

== Text input ==
Written Japanese uses several different scripts: kanji (Chinese characters), two sets of kana (phonetic syllabaries), and roman letters. While kana and roman letters can be typed directly into a computer, entering kanji is a more complicated process, as there are far more kanji than there are keys on most keyboards. To input kanji on modern computers, the reading of kanji is usually entered first. Then an input method editor (IME), also sometimes known as a front-end processor, shows a list of candidate kanji that are a phonetic match and allows the user to choose the correct kanji. More-advanced IMEs work not by word but by phrase, thus increasing the likelihood of getting the desired characters as the first option presented. Kanji readings inputs can be either via romanization (rōmaji nyūryoku, ローマ字入力) or direct kana input (kana nyūryoku, かな入力). Romaji input is more common on PCs and other full-size keyboards (although direct input is also widely supported), whereas direct kana input is typically used on mobile phones and similar devices – each of the 10 digits (1–9,0) corresponds to one of the 10 columns in the gojūon table of kana, and multiple presses select the row.

There are two main systems for the romanization of Japanese, known as Kunrei-shiki and Hepburn; in practice, "keyboard romaji" (also known as wāpuro rōmaji or "word processor romaji") generally allows a loose combination of both. IME implementations may even handle keys for letters unused in any romanization scheme, such as L, converting them to the most appropriate equivalent. With kana input, each key on the keyboard directly corresponds to one kana. The JIS keyboard system is the national standard, but there are alternatives, such as the thumb-shift keyboard, commonly used among professional typists.

== Direction of text ==
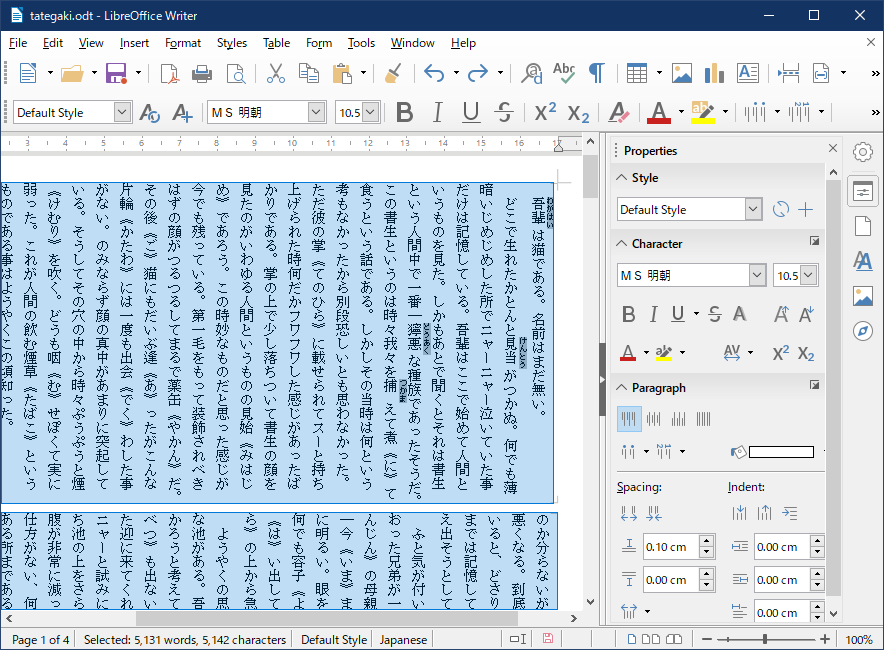
LibreOffice Writer supports downward text option.

Japanese can be written in two directions. Yokogaki style writes left-to-right, top-to-bottom, as with English. Tategaki style writes first top-to-bottom, and then moves right-to-left.

To compete with Ichitaro, Microsoft provided several updates for early Japanese versions of Microsoft Word, including support for downward text, such as the Word 5.0 Power Up Kit and Word 98.

QuarkXPress was the most popular DTP software in Japan in the 1990s, even though it had a long development cycle. However, due to a lack of support for downward text, it was surpassed by Adobe InDesign, which had strong support for downward text through several updates.

Until the introduction of the writing-mode: vertical-rl property and value in CSS level 3, HTML had poor support for tategaki, and Japanese users had to use HTML tables to simulate it.

== Historical development ==
The lack of proper Japanese character support on computers limited the influence of large American firms in the Japanese market during the 1980s. Japan, which had been the world's second largest market for computers after the United States at the time, was dominated by domestic hardware and software makers such as NEC and Fujitsu. Microsoft Windows 3.1 offered improved Japanese language support, which played a part in reducing the grip of domestic PC makers throughout the 1990s.

== See also ==
- Japanese writing system
- Japanese language
- Chinese input methods for computers
- CJK characters
- Korean language and computers
- Vietnamese language and computers
- Ghost characters – Erroneous kanji
