= Taiwan (People's Republic of China province) =

Claimed province of the People's Republic of China

Taiwan 台湾省
- Province
- Province of Taiwan

Name transcription(s)
  - Chinese: 台湾省 (Táiwān Shěng)
  - Abbreviation: TW / 台 (pinyin: Tái; Hokkien: Tâi; Hakka: Thòi)
  - Hokkien POJ: Tâi-oân-séng
  - Hakka PFS: Thòi-vàn-sén or Thòi-vân-sén
- Map showing the location of Taiwan Province
- Coordinates: 23°42′N 121°00′E
- Country: China
- Established from Fujian: 1887
- Cession to Japan: 17 April 1895
- Transfer to the ROC: 25 October 1945
- Claimed as part of PRC: 1 October 1949
- Capital: Taipei City
- Largest city: New Taipei City
- Divisions: See boundary change

Government
  - National People's Congress Representation: 13 deputies

Area
  - Total: 35,581 km^{2} (13,738 sq mi)
  - Rank: 28th

Population (2020)
  - Total: 23,561,236
  - Rank: 26th
  - Density: 662.19/km^{2} (1,715.1/sq mi)
  - Rank: 7th
- Demonym: Taiwan resident

Demographics
  - Ethnic composition: 98% Han Chinese; 2% Gaoshan people
- Time zone: UTC+8 (Beijing Time)
- ISO 3166 code: CN-TW
- Vehicle registration: 台
- GDP (2025 estimate): CN¥5.78 trillion
  - Per capita: CN¥247,439; US$ 34,426
- HDI (2021): 0.926 very high

Taiwan Province
- "Taiwan" in Traditional (top) and Simplified (bottom) Chinese characters
- Simplified Chinese: 台湾省
- Traditional Chinese: 臺灣省
Transcriptions
Standard Mandarin
- Hanyu Pinyin: Táiwān Shěng
- Bopomofo: ㄊㄞˊ ㄨㄢ ㄕㄥˇ
- Gwoyeu Romatzyh: Tair'uan Sheeng
- Wade–Giles: Tʻai^{2}-wan^{1} Sheng^{3}
- Tongyong Pinyin: Táiwan Shěng
- MPS2: Táiwān Shěng
- IPA: [tʰǎɪ.wán ʂə̀ŋ]
Hakka
- Pha̍k-fa-sṳ: Thòi-vàn-sén or; Thòi-vân-sén
Yue: Cantonese
- Yale Romanization: Tòihwāan Sáang
- Jyutping: Toi4 waan1 Saang2
- IPA: [tʰɔj˩.wan˥ saŋ˧˥]
Southern Min
- Hokkien POJ: Tâi-oân-séng
- Tâi-lô: Tâi-uân-síng
Eastern Min
- Fuzhou BUC: Dài-uăng sēng

Taiwan Province is a de jure administrative division claimed by the People's Republic of China (PRC) with no actual control. Its claimed jurisdiction includes the island of Taiwan and its affiliated islands, the Penghu Islands, and the Diaoyu Islands and their affiliated islands. The claimed territory of the hypothetical province is neither coextensive with the effective territory currently administered by the Republic of China (ROC), nor with the ROC division of Taiwan Province. The islands of Kinmen and Matsu, as well as some outlying islands in the South China Sea, despite being administered by the ROC and forming parts of Taiwan Area, are not legally regarded as parts of Taiwan province.

The political status of Taiwan is complex. The Taiwan Area, including those territories claimed by the PRC as a province, has been continuously administered by the government of the Republic of China (ROC) since the Japanese surrender of World War II. Following the communist victory over the Chinese Civil War, the communist-led People's Republic of China considers itself the successor state to the pre-1949 ROC and the sole legitimate government of "China", and thus it claims Taiwan as part of China under its One China principle. However, the PRC has never ruled Taiwan since its establishment in 1949. The PRC proposed that under a peaceful deal of unification, Taiwan would become a special administrative region under the "one country, two systems" framework rather than a province.

The PRC constitution asserts Taiwan as part of its territories. In spite of its claims, the PRC recognises that Taiwan is outside its actual territory of control and does not maintain a government in exile for the province. However, the National People's Congress reserves a position for legislators who are appointed by the PRC government to represent Taiwan, most of whom are of Taiwanese descent but were born in and are residents of mainland China. The Taiwan Affairs Office of the State Council of China is currently responsible over Taiwan-related matters, but it is neither tasked with, nor presented as, a shadow administration for Taiwan. Instead, the PRC government referred the ROC government in Taiwan as the "Taiwan authorities".

== Usage in the People's Republic of China ==
In official PRC statistics involving Taiwan, "Taiwan Area" is widely used instead, and is grouped with Special Administrative Regions rather than other provinces. The Banned and Sensitive Words in Xinhua News Agency Reports states that although Taiwan "is a province of China", reporters should use "Taiwan Area" or "Taiwan" instead of "Taiwan Province" because of "consideration of Taiwan people's feelings".

== Administrative divisions ==
Because the PRC government has never conducted administrative management of Taiwan, it has not organized administrative divisions. In the early days of the PRC, the annual Brief Account of Administrative Divisions of the People's Republic of China published by the government had no information on the establishment of provinces, cities and counties in Taiwan, and the provincial capital was not marked. It only had the words "awaiting liberation" in parentheses. After the reform and opening up, the annual Brief Account still had no information on the establishment and the name of the provincial capital. The parentheses were changed to "information temporarily unavailable". In the general map of the People's Republic of China in the booklet, the provincial capital was marked as "Taipei", but not "Taipei City".

Before 2016, in the map of "Taiwan Province" published by the PRC, Taiwan Province was divided into 7 cities (2 of which were marked as prefecture-level administrative regions, namely Taipei City and Kaohsiung City; 5 of which were marked as county-level administrative regions, namely Keelung City, Taichung City, Tainan City, Hsinchu City and Chiayi City) and 16 counties (namely Taipei County, Taoyuan County, Hsinchu County, Yilan County, Taichung County, Miaoli County, Changhua County, Yunlin County, Nantou County, Kaohsiung County, Tainan County, Chiayi County, Pingtung County, Taitung County, Hualien County and Penghu County), with the provincial capital marked as Taipei City. After 2016, the map published by the PRC began to follow the administrative divisions set by the ROC government that currently actually rules Taiwan, corresponding to the administrative divisions of mainland China, dividing Taiwan into 9 cities (6 of which were marked as prefecture-level administrative regions; 3 of which were marked as county-level administrative regions) and 11 counties, with the provincial capital marked as Taipei City.

On February 6, 2023, the Ministry of Natural Resources issued the "Specifications for the Representation of Contents in Public Maps". The Regulations on the Representation of Taiwan Province Maps state that: (I) Taiwan Province shall be represented on the map as a provincial administrative unit. Taipei City shall be represented as the provincial administrative center (the legend shall indicate the provincial administrative center). New Taipei City, Taoyuan City, Taichung City, Tainan City and Kaohsiung City of Taiwan Province shall be represented as prefecture-level administrative centers: (II) The map area of Taiwan Province shall include Diaoyu Island and Chiwei Island (except for maps named "Taiwan Island"). Diaoyu Island and Chiwei Island may be included in the entire map of Taiwan Province, or the geographical relationship between Taiwan Island and Diaoyu Island and Chiwei Island may be reflected in the attached map".

=== Administrative subdivisions (Tianditu & Mapping database) ===
Administrative divisions of Taiwan
ROC (Units)	PRC (Units)	Divisions
Special municipality 直轄市	Prefecture-level city 地级市	(6) Gaoxiong, Xinbei, Taizhong, Tainan, Taibei, Taoyuan
Provincial city 省轄市	County-level city 县级市 (Directly administered 直辖)	(3) Jiayi, Xinzhu, Jilong
County 縣	County 县 (Directly administered 直辖)	(11) Zhanghua, Jiayi, Xinzhu, Hualian, Miaoli, Nantou, Penghu, Pingdong, Taidong, Yilan, Yunlin
(Special municipalities) District (直轄市)區	District 区	(152 divisions)
Mountain indigenous district 直轄市山地原住民區	Gaoshanzu district 高山族区	(6 divisions)
(Provincial city) District (省轄市)區	Subdistrict 街道	(12 divisions)
County-administered city 縣轄市	Town-level city 镇级市	(14 divisions)
Urban township 鎮	Town 镇	(35 divisions)
Rural township 鄉	Township 乡	(115 divisions)
Indigenous township 山地鄉	Gaoshanzu township 高山族乡	(25 divisions)
Urban village 里	Community 社区	(5,852 divisions)
Rural village 村	Village 村	(1,850 divisions)
Neighborhoods 鄰	n/a	

== Politics ==
The NPC has included a Taiwan delegation since the 4th NPC in 1975. Delegations from Taiwan are chosen by "consultative election meetings" composed of 120 "compatriots of Taiwanese ancestry" hailing from various provinces in China, the central government and party agencies, and the military. Since the 6th NPC, Taiwan has been given 6 deputies at the NPC.

== Communications ==
In the telephone area codes of the People's Republic of China, the 6-series area codes were originally reserved for Taiwan. The C1 exchange code 026, the provincial exchange center and the regional exchange center 61x, and the county exchange center 62x are also in a reserved state. However, in recent years, due to insufficient number segment resources, the Ministry of Industry and Information Technology allocated the 6-series number segments 63, 66, and 69 to Shandong, Guangdong, and Yunnan for use.

== See also ==
- Provinces of China
- Taiwan Province, Republic of China
- Taiwan Affairs Office
- Political status of Taiwan
- Cross-strait relations
- "Taiwan, China" (term)
