= Google Japanese Input =

Japanese input method editor

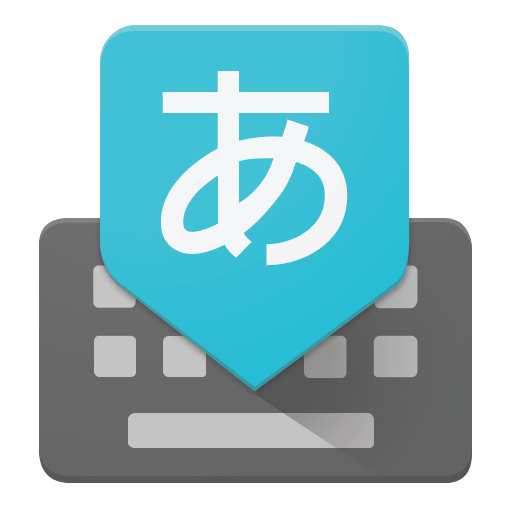
- Developer: Google
- Initial release: December 3, 2009; 15 years ago
- Stable release: Windows; 2.24.3250.0 (January 27, 2019; 6 years ago) [±] Mac OS; 2.20.2700.1 (November 10, 2016; 9 years ago) [±] Android; 2.24.3535.3.231113858 (January 27, 2019; 6 years ago) [±]
- Preview release: Windows; 2.20.2770.100 (March 26, 2013; 12 years ago) [±] Mac OS; 1.10.1389.101 (March 26, 2013; 12 years ago) [±]
- Operating system: Windows 10, Windows 8, Windows 7, OS X v10.9
- Type: Japanese input
- License: Freeware
- Website: www.google.co.jp/ime/

Mozc
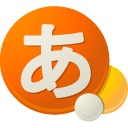

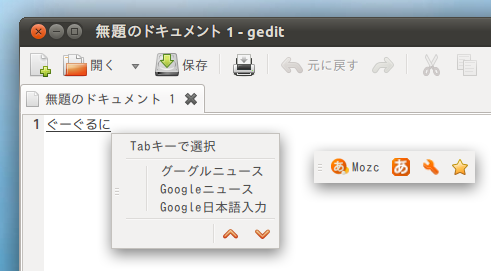
- Japanese input
- Developer: Google Inc.
- Stable release: 2.29.5160.102 / July 28, 2023; 2 years ago
- Operating system: Linux; Microsoft Windows macOS over 10.14; Android; ChromeOS
- Type: Japanese input methods
- License: 3 BSD
- Website: github.com/google/mozc/

Google Japanese Input (Google 日本語入力, Gūguru Nihongo Nyūryoku) is an input method published by Google for the entry of Japanese text on a computer. Since its dictionaries are generated automatically from the Internet, it supports typing of personal names, Internet slang, neologisms and related terms. Google Japanese Input can be used on Windows, macOS, and ChromeOS.

Google also released an open-source version under the name mozc. It can be used on Linux, Windows, macOS, Android, and ChromeOS. It does not use Google's closed-source algorithms for generating dictionary data from online sources.

== See also ==
- Google IME
- Google Pinyin
