= Town-level city =

Administrative division of China

- Simplified Chinese: 镇级市
- Traditional Chinese: 鎮級市
Transcriptions
Standard Mandarin
- Hanyu Pinyin: Zhènjíshì

Town-level city (Chinese: 镇级市) is a proposed pilot designation for a type of administrative division of China. A town-level city is officially considered to be a town, but it has more power de facto because the cadres assigned to its government are one half-level higher in rank than those of an "ordinary" town—though still lower than those of a county-level city. In order to be designated as a town-level city a town must have the minimum population of 100 thousand (except for Western China and Northeast China) and cannot be a county-level division administrative seat of government also cannot be within of any national urban planning zones (suburban towns are also excluded).
