= Cross-Strait Act =

1992 law on Taiwan–China relations

Legislative Yuan
- Long title: Act Governing Relations between the People of the Taiwan Area and the Mainland Area
- Citation: Laws and regulations database
- Passed: 16 July 1992
- Commenced: 31 July 1992

Related legislation
- Additional Articles of the Constitution of the Republic of China

Keywords
- Cross-strait relations, Taiwanese people, Chinese people
- Status: Amended

Act Governing Relations between the People of the Taiwan Area and the Mainland Area
- Traditional Chinese: 臺灣地區與大陸地區人民關係條例
- Simplified Chinese: 台湾地区与大陆地区人民关系条例
Transcriptions
Standard Mandarin
- Hanyu Pinyin: Táiwān Dìqū yǔ Dàlù Dìqū Rénmín Guānxì Tiáolì
- Wade–Giles: T'ai²-wan¹ Ti⁴-chü¹ yü³ Ta⁴-lu⁴ Ti⁴-chü¹ Jên²-min² Kuan¹-hsi⁴ T'iao²-li⁴
Hakka
- Pha̍k-fa-sṳ: Thòi-vàn Thi-khî ì Thai-liu̍k Thi-khî Ngìn-mìn Kôan-he Thiàu-li
Southern Min
- Hokkien POJ: Tâi-oân Tē-khu ú Tāi-lio̍k Tē-khu Jîn-bîn Koan-hē Tiâu-lē
- Tâi-lô: Tâi-uân tē-khu ú Tāi-lio̍k Tē-khu Jîn-bîn Koan-hē Tiâu-lē

Cross-Strait Act
- Traditional Chinese: 兩岸條例
- Simplified Chinese: 两岸条例
Transcriptions
Standard Mandarin
- Hanyu Pinyin: Liǎng'àn Tiáolì
- Wade–Giles: Liang³-an⁴ T'iao²-li⁴
Hakka
- Pha̍k-fa-sṳ: Lióng-ngan Thiàu-li
Southern Min
- Hokkien POJ: Lióng-gān Tiâu-lē
- Tâi-lô: Lióng-gān Tiâu-lē

People of the Cross-Strait Act
- Traditional Chinese: 兩岸人民條例
- Simplified Chinese: 两岸人民条例
Transcriptions
Standard Mandarin
- Hanyu Pinyin: Liǎng'àn Rénmín Tiáolì
- Wade–Giles: Liang³-an⁴ Jên²-min² T'iao²-li⁴
Hakka
- Pha̍k-fa-sṳ: Lióng-ngan Ngìn-mìn Thiàu-li
Southern Min
- Hokkien POJ: Lióng-gān Jîn-bîn Tiâu-lē
- Tâi-lô: Lióng-gān Jîn-bîn Tiâu-lē

Cross-Strait Relations Act
- Traditional Chinese: 兩岸關係條例
- Simplified Chinese: 两岸关系条例
Transcriptions
Standard Mandarin
- Hanyu Pinyin: Liǎng'àn Guānxì Tiáolì
- Wade–Giles: Liang³-an⁴ Kuan¹-hsi⁴ T'iao²-li⁴
Hakka
- Pha̍k-fa-sṳ: Lióng-ngan Kôan-he Thiàu-li
Southern Min
- Hokkien POJ: Lióng-gān Koan-hē Tiâu-lē
- Tâi-lô: Lióng-gān Kuan-hē Tiâu-lē

The Act Governing Relations between the People of the Taiwan Area and the Mainland Area (Chinese: 臺灣地區與大陸地區人民關係條例), also called Cross-Strait Act (Chinese: 兩岸條例), is the law of the Republic of China (Taiwan or ROC) governing cross-strait relations. In article 1, the act mentions its applicability in the period before national unification.

The main purpose of the act is to protect the security and welfare of the people of Taiwan. The act defines its de facto controlled territory as the Taiwan Area, while at the same time affirming sovereignty over the Mainland area in article 2. It also provides a legal framework on the relations between Taiwan and mainland China without recognising the People's Republic of China (PRC) and its governmental organisations. It is enacted in accordance with Article 11 of the Additional Articles of the Constitution of the Republic of China promulgated on 1 May 1991.

== History ==
The act was drafted in the late 1980s and early 1990s. Early on 10 May 1948, the National Assembly of the Republic of China adopted the Temporary Provisions against the Communist Rebellion in the midst of the civil war between the Chinese Communist Party and the Kuomintang. In 1949, the Communists overthrew the Nationalist Government from mainland China, and proclaimed the establishment of the People's Republic of China while the government retreated to Taiwan, formerly a Qing province ceded to the Empire of Japan from 1895 to 1945.

During the "Communist Rebellion" period, the ROC regarded cross-Strait relation as at war. However, after the PRC implemented reform and opening up and altered the approach to Taiwan starting from 1980s, the ROC Government allowed nationals to visit their mainland relatives in 1987, and the necessity of regulating the cross-strait relationship arose thereafter.

In 1989, the Ministry of Justice unveiled the Provisional Bill Governing Relations between the People of the Taiwan Area and Mainland Area (Chinese: 臺灣地區與大陸地區人民關係暫行條例草案). In 1991, the Temporary Provisions were repealed by President Lee Teng-hui, which allowed the act to be passed by the Legislative Yuan on 16 July 1992 and commenced at the end of the month.

== Imposition ==
=== Amendments and constitutional validity ===
The act is prominent in governing the relationship between Taiwan and mainland China, which various subsidiary legislations were made under this law, and was amended during the ruling of both Kuomintang and Democratic Progressive Party (DPP).

Article 18 of the act, regarding the deportation of mainlanders that legally entered Taiwan, was ruled unconstitutional in 2013. An amendment was passed in 2019 which any cross-Strait political settlement must be considered by the parliament twice and approved in referendum before being signed by the president. A year later, parliamentarians from DPP tabled amendments to repeal wordings of "before national unification" and substitute with "accordingly to national development" or "during which the governance is limited to Tai-Peng-Kin-Ma and affiliated islands", but was withdrawn days later after first reading.

=== Applicability on Hong Kong and Macau ===
According to the act, "people of the Taiwan area" refers to those under the jurisdiction of the government of the Republic of China on Taiwan and its associated islands; "people of the Mainland area" refers to those under the jurisdiction of the government of the People's Republic of China, with the exception of Hong Kong (a former British colony that was ceded by the Qing in 1842) and Macau (formerly a Portuguese colony ceded by the Qing in 1887) which are governed by the separate Laws and Regulations Regarding Hong Kong & Macao Affairs, unless changes in Hong Kong and Macau endanger Taiwan's security as stipulated by Article 60 of the Laws and Regulations:

[...] should any change occur in the situation of Hong Kong or Macau such that the implementation of this Act endangers the security of the Taiwan Area, the Executive Yuan may request the President to order suspension of the application of all or part of the provisions of this Act [...] Should the application of any part of this Act be suspended and no other laws or regulations be formulated to govern relations between the Taiwan Area and Hong Kong or Macau, the relevant provisions of the Act Governing the Relations Between People of the Taiwan Area and the Mainland Area shall apply.

=== Ban on Mainland Chinese online platforms ===
Chiu Chui-cheng, spokesman of the Mainland Affairs Council, revealed to Nikkei Asia in 2019 that the ROC government planned to block iQIYI and Tencent Video (or WeTV) in Taiwan to curb false information against Taiwan made by the PRC government. Chiu added that OTT, a Taiwanese subsidiary of iQIYI, was placed under investigation by the ROC's Ministry of Economic Affairs, and could be asked to close its "iQIYI Taiwan Station" if found in violation of the Act.

On 19 August 2020, the Department of Commerce of the Economic Affairs Ministry, citing relevant regulations of the Act, banned OTT (and by extension iQIYI and Tencent Video) from further operating in Taiwan, or risk a continuous fine ranging from NT$50,000 to NT$5 million.

=== Reinterpretation on household registration of Mainland China ===
According to Article 9–1, it forbids Taiwan residents to held household registration or passport issued by mainland China authorities, or else facing risk of losing rights as Taiwan residents. In April 2025, the Mainland Affairs Council announced that the definition of household registration expand to permanent resident certificates, and on 5 June 2025, Chang Li-chi, a professor at Huaqiao University lost his Taiwan resident status for holding permanent resident certificate.

=== "Nationality" debate ===
A village head from mainland China removed by the Ministry of Interior for failing to "renounce Chinese nationality", later she won the appeal against the decision. However the ministry insisted the interpretation of "nationality" on its own. Kuomintang legislators later introduced a bill to tighten the definition of "nationality", which defines former mainland residents acquire status of Taiwan residence as "household registration" not "nationality".

== See also ==
- Cross-strait relations
- Additional Articles of the Constitution of the Republic of China
- 1992 Consensus
- One-China policy
- Political status of Taiwan
- Republic of China retreat to Taiwan
