= Banned and Sensitive Words in Xinhua News Agency Reports =

News censorship guidelines in China

Banned and Sensitive Words in Xinhua News Agency Reports is a style and usage guide issued by Xinhua News Agency regarding banned and sensitive words. According to reports, Banned and Sensitive words in Xinhua News Agency Reports (First Batch) was published in the 315th issue of Xinhua News Agency's News Review Dynamics in November 2015. It was also reported that the first batch of prohibited words was published and followed around 2005. The content involves prohibited words related to current affairs and social life, prohibited words related to laws and regulations, prohibited words related to ethnic and religious affairs, prohibited words related to Hong Kong, Macau and Taiwan and territorial sovereignty, and prohibited words related to international relations.

== History ==
The relevant documents may have undergone multiple revisions and be privately released, and there may be individuals who compile and publish them independently. In 2005, the Xinhua News Agency's General Editorial Office summarized the prohibited words stipulated by various editorial departments and released the Prohibited Words in News Reports (Batch 1), which was then disseminated online. In November 2015, Xinhua News Agency released the List of Prohibited Words in News Reports (First Batch). The document was revised in July 2016, adding 57 new items. The third batch was released in 2019. The document was further updated in 2023.

== Content ==
The document lists the prohibited and sensitive words in media reports for editors and journalists. While not officially published by Xinhua itself, the guide has circulated among staff in state media organizations.
