= Thumb-shift keyboard =

Keyboard design

The thumb-shift keyboard (親指シフト, oyayubi shifuto) is a keyboard design for inputting Japanese sentences on word processors and computers. It was invented by Fujitsu in the late 1970s and released in 1980 as a feature of the line of Japanese word processors the company sold, named OASYS, to make Japanese input easier, faster and more natural. It is popular among people who input large quantities of Japanese sentences, such as writers, playwrights, lawyers and so on, because of its ease of use and speed. The rights regarding the use of this design were transferred to Nihongo Nyuuryoku Consortium (Japanese Input Consortium), a technology sharing cooperative of interested companies, in 1989. It is referred to as an example of keyboard layout in Japanese Industrial Standards.

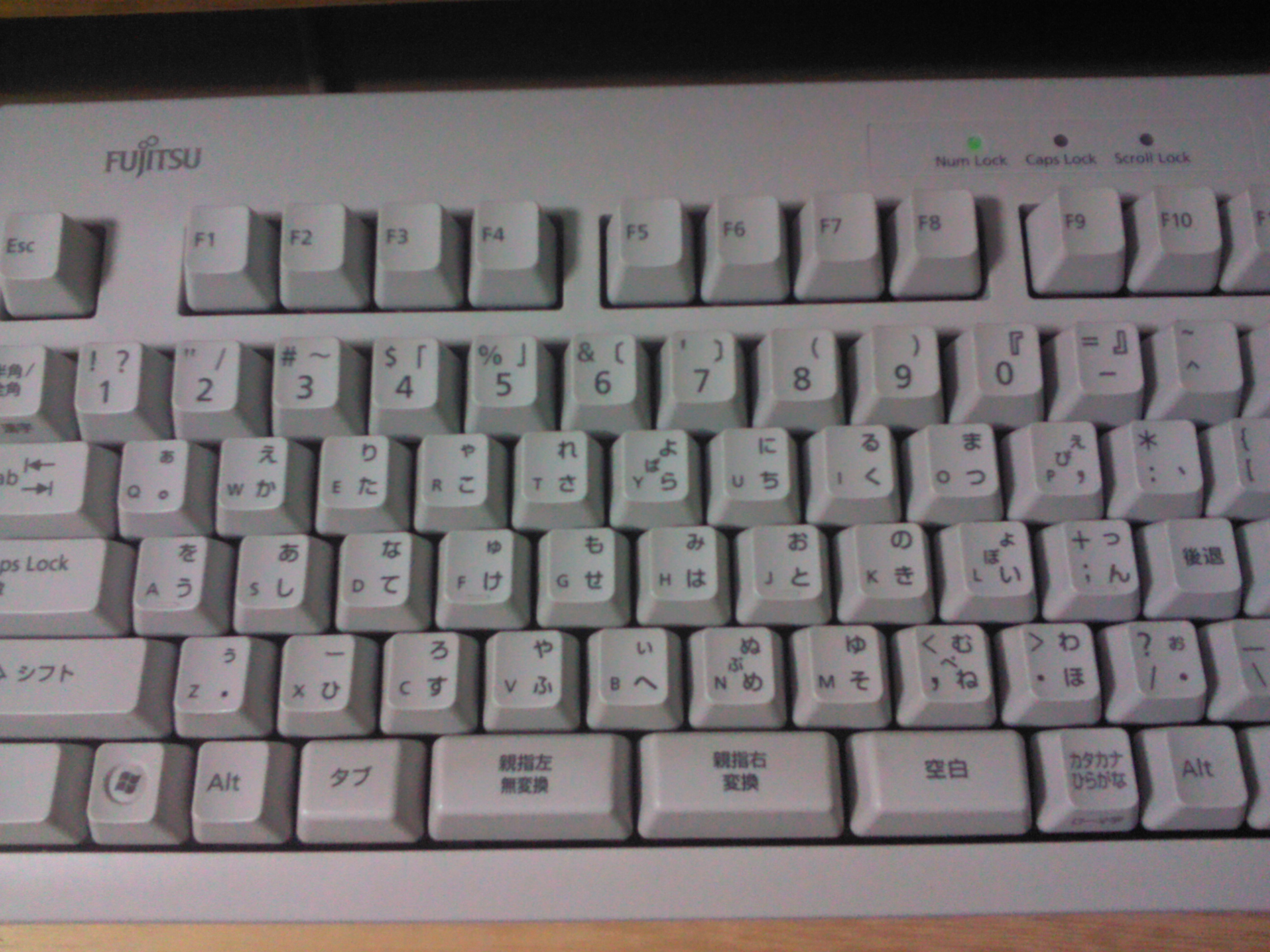
An example of a thumb-shift keyboard. Notice the two keys operated by the thumbs at the center bottom.

== Background ==
=== Inputting Japanese sentences with computers ===
When word processors for the Japanese language developed in the late 1970s, one of the most difficult tasks was how to input Japanese sentences. Since the Japanese writing system uses three character-sets (hiragana, katakana and kanji), with a large number of individual characters (about 80 for hiragana and katakana, and thousands for kanji), it is not possible to accommodate all these on standard keyboards. Kanji posed the greatest challenge, and developers tried various methods, such as handwriting recognition, large tablet-type input devices, assigning multiple key-codes to each character and so on, but the method called kana-kanji transformation became the primary input method. It works by inputting transliteration, either in kana or by using Latin characters (rōmaji), and the dictionary in the computer changes the input sequences into kanji. The program that accomplishes this task is called an input method editor.

=== Conventional keyboard input methods for Japanese ===
There were basically two methods: one is to use Roman alphabet and the other hiragana. In the former (called romaji-kana system), QWERTY is commonly used. In the latter (called JIS kana system), hiragana characters are placed on the keys but since the number of hiragana is large, not only the common character keys but also the top number keys are used. In addition to that, some characters must be input using shift keys, just as the upper case characters in English.

=== Problems with conventional methods ===
Although the abovementioned methods have the advantage of compatibility with widely-available keyboards, there are drawbacks.

The conventional Japanese keyboard layout is considered by some to be unsuitable for Japanese input. In the JIS kana system, as has been mentioned earlier, some characters are placed far up in the numbers row, making the possibility of typing error higher. The input of numbers is also a problem because some characters share the key positions with numbers.

With romaji input methods, the number of keystrokes increases compared to kana input methods, as most kana require at least two keystrokes to input with romaji, compared to a single keystroke for direct kana input. On average, the number of characters required to transliterate Japanese sentences using romaji is roughly 1.7 times that of kana.

== Thumb-shift keyboard ==
=== History and main idea ===
The engineers at Fujitsu, led by Yasunori Kanda, who were developing Japanese word processors, first tried to use simultaneous pressing of multiple character keys to differentiate hiragana characters but they found it difficult to use. They then came up with an idea of using the thumb in conjunction with other fingers. Unlike the shift action with the little finger on an English keyboard, in which the shift key is pressed and held while a character key is pressed, this method uses simultaneous pressing by the thumb and another finger. This has several advantages. First, it enables each key to be conjugated in three ways: without thumb action, with the same-hand thumb, and with the thumb of the opposite hand. This means that the keyboard can accommodate half as much more characters than in the usual method. Second, simultaneous pressing with the thumb is more natural than the shift action with the little finger because of anatomy: thumbs are much stronger than little fingers. Third, since this was a new concept, it was possible to choose a better layout of characters, taking into account such parameters as frequency of occurrence, sequencing of characters and phonological structure of the Japanese language.

=== Implementation in OASYS and other platforms ===
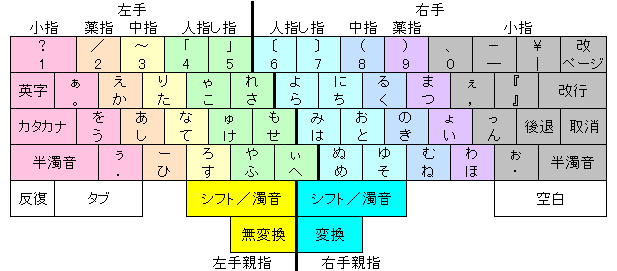
Original implementation.

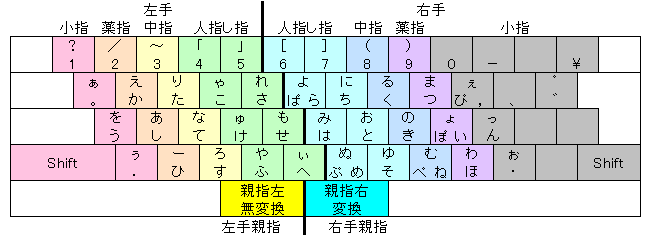
a variation of thumb-shift keyboard called NiCOLA.

Fujitsu's first Japanese word processor, named OASYS, with thumb-shift keyboard was launched in 1979 and became a big hit. As the line of products expanded, so did the popularity of thumb-shift keyboard. The share of OASYS in the Japanese word processor market reached 20 percent at one time (not all of OASYS were equipped with thumb-shift keyboard, though). But the adoption was slow to spread to other manufacturers' product lines. Although Fujitsu was open to adoption by other manufacturers, there was little incentive for them to adopt their rival's system in the (then) fiercely competitive environment of word processor market. It was only in 1989 when Nihongo Nyuuryoku Consortium (Japanese input consortium) was established with a participation of several companies, including Fujitsu, Sony, Apple Computer, Japan IBM and Panasonic, as the promotion body of thumb-shift. The rights regarding the use of thumb-shift were officially transferred from Fujitsu to the Consortium. It was also a time in which there was a rapid shift from dedicated word processors to personal computers. Although Fujitsu kept producing PCs with a thumb-shift keyboard, including portables, most users preferred ones with an ordinary keyboard and there were very few PC manufacturers which offered thumb-shift. Thus, the growth of PC market did not translate into that of thumb-shift and the share of thumb-shift declined quickly. As of October 2011, three models of thumb-shift keyboard for PC, as well as two portable PCs are on sale.

NICOLA is a variation of thumb-shift keyboard. In this keyboard layout, Henkan ("変換", conversion) is merged with right thumb-shift and Muhenkan ("無変換", non-conversion) merged with left one because USB HID does not allow additional key left thumb-shift and right thumb-shift .

=== Basic principles and character layout ===
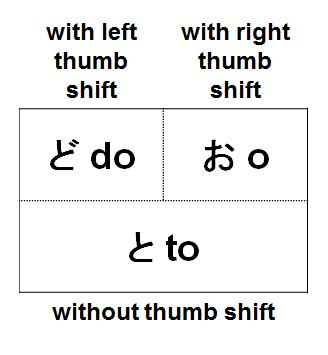
Characters represented by 'J' key in thumb-shift keyboard.

With thumb-shift, each key can be used in three ways, which means that the most accessible 30 keys on the keyboard can represent 90 characters. This is sufficient for all the hiragana characters and some punctuation marks. The allocation of the characters was decided on the study of Japanese corpus.

The alternate characters are typed with the use of thumb-shift key on the same side of the keyboard relative to the key. Thumb action of the opposite hand (known as cross-shifting) is used to type the characters representing a voiced sound, written in hiragana by adding a diacritic mark (dakuten) on the corresponding voiceless sound characters. This has an advantage in memorization because it is not necessary to memorize two positions.

For example, take the home position of the right index finger (letter 'j' in QWERTY). Without thumb action, it is 'to' (と). It is 'o' (お) with the right thumb shift and 'do' (ど) with the left thumb shift.

The semi-voiced sounds, represented in kana by the handakuten diacritic mark, are typed either by using the conventional little finger-operated shift key, or by cross-shifting with keys which do not have voiced counterparts (these are marked in a smaller font in the center of keys in question, see photo at the top of the page).

=== Accomplishments ===
The advantages of this system are mainly in three areas: ease of use, faster learning, and faster writing speed. The first is the result of several factors. Placing all hiragana in the 30 most used keys (this is not the case in JIS kana), rational allocation of characters on keys (not the case in JIS kana or in alphabet) and the use of simultaneous hit by the thumb. Perfect correspondence of key action and hiragana character (in JIS kana, voiced characters require two actions: inputting an unvoiced character followed by diacritic mark) is welcomed by users and some say that with thumb-shift keyboard one can input as quickly and easily as talking. The second is shown in an experiment conducted by beginning typists, in which thumb-shift users consistently outpace those of JIS kana and romaji-kana. The third is shown by the fact that many of the top typists in word processor speed contests use this system. The top speed, measured by the number of characters in completed sentences, i.e. after kana kanji transformation, exceeds 250 characters per minute.

=== Drawbacks ===
The major drawback of the method is that it requires special hardware with two thumb-shift keys at the center bottom. This is most serious in portable computers, which have a fixed keyboard. Although some try to emulate thumb-shift using conventional keyboard, the results are mixed. A small user base of this system means that the availability of dedicated hardware is limited and that its cost is high.

=== Popularity ===
Despite the drawbacks, thumb-shift is popular among people who write a large amount of sentences, including writers, playwrights and lawyers. They cite various explanations for their preference: speed, naturalness, less fatigue and so on. One author puts it this way: "Thumb-shift keyboard enables you to not only move your brain and fingers in sync with the proper rhythm of the Japanese language but also type fast. It is the keyboard that protects the beauty of the mother tongue."

=== Implementation in major operating systems ===
In addition to the hardware, it is usually necessary to use some software to implement thumb-shift. Some examples in major operating systems are described below.

==== Windows ====
Input method editor Japanist 2003 by Fujitsu offers the function of thumb-shift together with kana-kanji transformation. Other programs, called thumb-shift emulators, can be used in conjunction with other input method editor of choice.

==== Mac OS ====
Thumb-shift emulators are available as either commercial or free software.

==== Linux ====
Input method editors scim-anthy and ibus-anthy, which are included in major distributions of linux, offer thumb-shift functionality.

=== Possible application to other languages ===
Although thumb-shift has been developed for Japanese input, the potential exists to be used for other languages. There are a few reasons for that. First, the capacity to include more characters on keys makes it possible for languages with larger character set, including diacritic marks, to be input from more accessible positions. Second, using simultaneous hit with thumb is more natural than shift with little finger, regardless of language. There have been proposals for Chinese, Hangul, Vietnamese and so on.
