= Taiwan Area =

Territories under the de facto control of the Republic of China

Taiwan Area 臺灣地區
- Largest cities: New Taipei City
- Languages: Mandarin; Taiwanese Hokkien; Hakka; Formosan languages; Matsunese
- Ethnic groups: Han; Taiwanese indigenous peoples
- Demonym: Taiwanese (mainly in Taiwan and Penghu) Kinmenese (Kinmen) Matsunese (Matsu)

Area
  - Total: 36,193 km^{2} (13,974 sq mi)

Population
  - 2018 census: 23,681,968
  - Density: 650/km^{2} (1,683.5/sq mi)
- Currency: New Taiwan Dollar (TWD, NTD)
- Time zone: UTC+08:00 (National Standard Time)
- Date format: yyyy年mm月dd日
- Calling code: +886
- Internet TLD: .tw, .台灣, .台湾

Taiwan Area
- Traditional Chinese: 臺灣地區
- Simplified Chinese: 台湾地区
Transcriptions
Standard Mandarin
- Hanyu Pinyin: Táiwān Dìqū
- Bopomofo: ㄊㄞˊ ㄨㄢ ㄉㄧˋ ㄑㄩ
- Gwoyeu Romatzyh: Tair'uan Dihchiu
- Wade–Giles: T'ai²-wan¹ Ti⁴-chü¹
- Tongyong Pinyin: Táiwan Zìhyóu Dìcyu
- MPS2: Táiwān Dìchiū
Hakka
- Pha̍k-fa-sṳ: Thòi-vàn Thi-khî
Southern Min
- Hokkien POJ: Tâi-oân Tē-khu
- Tâi-lô: Tâi-uân Tē-khu
Eastern Min
- Fuzhou BUC: Dài-uăng Dê-kṳ̆

Free area of the Republic of China
- Traditional Chinese: 中華民國自由地區
- Simplified Chinese: 中华民国自由地区
Transcriptions
Standard Mandarin
- Hanyu Pinyin: Zhōnghuá Mínguó Zìyóu Dìqū
- Bopomofo: ㄓㄨㄥ ㄏㄨㄚˊ ㄇㄧㄣˊ ㄍㄨㄛˊ ㄗˋ ㄧㄡˊ ㄉㄧˋ ㄑㄩ
- Gwoyeu Romatzyh: Jonghwa Min'gwo Tzyh'you Dihchiu
- Wade–Giles: Chung¹-hua² Min²-kuo² Tzŭ⁴-yu² Ti⁴-chü¹
- Tongyong Pinyin: Jhonghuá Mínguó Zìhyóu Dìcyu
- MPS2: Jūnghuá Mínguó Tz̀yóu Dìchiū
Hakka
- Pha̍k-fa-sṳ: Chûng-fà Mìn-koet Chhṳ-yù Thi-khî
Southern Min
- Hokkien POJ: Tiong-hôa Bîn-kok Chū-iû Tē-khu
- Tâi-lô: Tiong-hûa Bîn-kok Tsū-iû Tē-khu
Eastern Min
- Fuzhou BUC: Dṳ̆ng-huà Mìng-guók Cê̤ṳ-iù Dê-kṳ̆

Tai-Peng-Kin-Ma
- Traditional Chinese: 臺澎金馬
- Simplified Chinese: 台澎金马
Transcriptions
Standard Mandarin
- Hanyu Pinyin: Tái Péng Jīn Mǎ
- Bopomofo: ㄊㄞ´ ㄆㄥ´ ㄐㄧㄣ ㄇㄚˇ
- Gwoyeu Romatzyh: Tair Perng Jin Maa
- Wade–Giles: T'ai² P'êng² Chin¹ Ma³
- Tongyong Pinyin: Tái Péng Jin Mǎ
- MPS2: Tái Péng Jin Mǎ
Hakka
- Pha̍k-fa-sṳ: Thòi-Phàng-Kîm-Mâ
Southern Min
- Hokkien POJ: Tâi-Phêⁿ-Kim-Má
- Tâi-lô: Tâi-Phênn-Kim-Má
Eastern Min
- Fuzhou BUC: Dài-Pàng-Gĭng-Mā

The Taiwan Area, also called the Taiwan Area of the Republic of China, the free area of the Republic of China, (Note: In local languages: Traditional Chinese script: 中華民國自由地區; Mandarin Pinyin: Zhōnghuá Mínguó Zìyóu Dìqū; Hokkien: Tiong-hôa Bîn-kok Chū-iû Tē-khu; Sixian Hakka: Chûng-fà Mìn-koet Chhṳ-yù Thi-khî; Matsu: Dṳ̆ng-huà Mìng-guók Cê̤ṳ-iù Dê-kṳ̆) and the "Tai-Min Area (Taiwan and Fuchien)", is a term used to refer to the territories under the effective control of the Republic of China (ROC, commonly known as "Taiwan"). It has been in official use since the Additional Articles of the Constitution of the Republic of China took effect, ending temporary anti-communist provisions on 1 May 1991. The term is also used in the 1992 Cross-Strait Act.

The area currently under the definition consists of the island groups of Taiwan, Penghu, Kinmen, Matsu and some minor islands. The collective term "Tai-Peng-Kin-Ma" is literally equivalent except that it only refers to the geographical areas of Taiwan, Penghu, Kinmen and Matsu Area, to the exclusion of Wuqiu, Dongsha Island, and Taiping Island.

The term is complementary to "Mainland Area", which is practically viewed as being synonymous to mainland China under the control of the People's Republic of China (PRC, commonly known as "China"). This is despite the fact that the Republic of China's constitution never defined specific territorial boundaries. Although acknowledging the reality of the Taiwan Strait, technically the Republic of China still claims to be the sole representative of China with its constitution.

The government of the People's Republic of China similarly uses the terms "Taiwan area" and "Taiwan resident" to refer the territory and population of the ROC under its One China Principle. The PRC recognizes its lack of control over Taiwan and maintains no government in exile or shadow administration, instead operating its relation with the ROC via the Taiwan Affairs Office.

== Background ==
The term "free area" or "Free China" was used during the Second Sino-Japanese War (1937–45) to describe the territories under the control of the Kuomintang led Nationalist government in Chungking (today Chongqing), as opposed to the parts of China under Japanese occupation, including Nanking (today Nanjing) the capital of the Republic of China until the Japanese invasion in 1937.

The Japanese occupation ended with the imperial surrender in 1945, but the term "Free China" was soon to acquire a new meaning in the context of the early Cold War. Following the Communist Party's victory in the Chinese Civil War in 1949, the newly inaugurated People's Republic of China solidified its control of mainland China, while the Kuomintang government retreated to Taiwan and selected Taipei to serve as the provisional capital of the Republic of China. Mainland China was officially considered to be in a state of "Communist Rebellion", also known as "Communist China" or "Red China", and furthermore all territories still under Nationalist administration were said to constitute the "Free Area" of China, also known as "Nationalist China" or "Free China". This period of mobilization was officially terminated by the government on 1 May 1991 with the implementation of the Additional Articles of the Constitution.

Prior to the Battle of Dachen Archipelago in 1955, the Free Area also encompassed a group of islands off Zhejiang, up to then part of the ROC province of Chekiang. The islands have since been administered exclusively by the People's Republic of China.

== Nomenclature ==
Various names used to describe the geopolitical area include:

Taiwan related territory terms
Short name	Taiwan	The Free Area	Tai-Peng-Kin-Ma Area	Tai-Min Region
Long name	Taiwan Area	Free Area of the Republic of China	Taiwan-Penghu-Kinmen-Matsu Area	Taiwan-Fuchien Region
Chinese	臺灣地區	自由地區	臺澎金馬地區	臺閩地區
Mandarin	Táiwān dìqū	Zìyóu dìqū	Tái-Pēng-Jīn-Mǎ dìqū	Tái-Mǐn dìqū
Taiwanese Hokkien	Tâi-oân tē-khu	Chū-iû tē-khu	Tâi-Phêⁿ-Kim-Má tē-khu	Tâi-Bân tē-khu
Hakka	Thòi-vàn thi-khî	Chhṳ-yù thi-khî	Thòi-Phàng-Kîm-Mâ thi-khî	Thòi-Mén thi-khî
Matsunese	Dài-uăng dê-kṳ̆	Cê̤ṳ-iù dê-kṳ̆	Dài-Pàng-Gĭng-Mā dê-kṳ̆	Dài-Mìng dê-kṳ̆
Notes	Refers to the general area surrounding the island of Taiwan. This term is used by various laws and regulations that governing cross-strait relations.	"Free" refers to the area that is not under the Communist Party's control. This term is used by the Additional Articles of the Constitution.	Refers to the four main archipelagos under the government's jurisdiction.	Refers to the two historical provinces under actual administration. Namely, Taiwan (Taiwan and Penghu) and a small part of Fukien (Kinmen and Matsu). 閩 is the traditional abbreviation for Fukien.

== Legal use ==
The term "free area of the Republic of China" has persisted to the present day in the ROC legislation. The Additional Articles of the Constitution of the Republic of China delegates numerous rights to exercise the sovereignty of the state, including that of electing the President and Legislature, to citizens residing in the "free area of the Republic of China". This term was put into the Constitution with the promulgation of the first set of amendments to the Constitution in 1991 and has been retained in the most recent revision passed in 2005.

The need to use the term "free area" in the Constitution arose out of the discrepancy between the notion that the Republic of China was the sole legitimate government of China and the pressures of the popular sovereignty movement. In the 1980s and 1990s, there were demands, particularly by the Tangwai movement and other groups opposed to one-party authoritarian KMT rule, to restructure the ROC government, long dominated by mainlanders, to be more representative of the Taiwanese people it governed. For example, until 1991, members of the National Assembly and Legislative Yuan elected in 1948 to serve mainland constituencies remained in their posts indefinitely and the President of the Republic of China was to be elected by this same "Eternal Parliament" dominated by aging KMT members. However, more conservative politicians, while acquiescing to the need for increased democracy, feared that constitutional changes granting localized sovereignty would jeopardize the ROC government's claims as the legitimate Chinese government and thereby promote Taiwan independence.

While the 1991 revisions of the Constitution granted the sovereignty rights to the Taiwanese people, it did not explicitly name Taiwan and instead used the term "free area" to maintain the notion that the Republic of China encompassed more than Taiwan. In ordinary legislation, the term "Taiwan Area" is usually used, especially in contexts of trade and exchange. In contrast to the "free area" is the "mainland area", which the Act Governing Relations between the People of the Taiwan Area and the Mainland Area defines as "the territory of the Republic of China outside the Taiwan Area". However, on more practical grounds, the "mainland area" refers simply to Mainland China.

In addition, there are two other Acts defining other "areas": the "Hong Kong and Macau Area" (Chinese: 港澳地區). The hand-over of these former European colonies to the People's Republic of China under a One Country, Two Systems areangement necessitated laws governing the relations of the Taiwan Area with them. The Acts are worded in a manner to avoid discussing whether the Republic of China claims sovereignty over Hong Kong and Macau.

=== Use by People's Republic of China ===
Based on the one China principle, the People's Republic of China (PRC) does not recognize the legitimacy of the ROC. A series of standardized terms called "Taiwan-related terms" were invented by the PRC government, which are used in official statements, news reports, and press releases, etc., to serve this purpose. Among them, the terms "Taiwan area" or "Taiwan authority" (台湾当局) are commonly used to replace "Republic of China" or "Taiwan" (because mentioning only "Taiwan" but not "Taiwan area" or "Taiwan Province" would give an impression that Taiwan is an independent country). For example, the term "Leader of the Taiwan area" (台湾地区领导人) is used to replace "President of the Republic of China" or "President of Taiwan", "Taiwanese citizens" is replaced with "Residents of Taiwan area", and Executive Yuan is called "Taiwan area's executive body" (台湾地区行政管理机构), etc.

In official PRC statistics involving Taiwan, "Taiwan Area" is widely used instead, corresponding to the ROC's Free Area of the Republic of China, and is treated together with Special Administrative Regions rather than other provinces. Taiwan Province only includes Taiwan and associated islands such as the Pescadores Islands, but "Taiwan Area" (the same as "Taiwan Area" as used by ROC, a.k.a.) is all area administered by Taipei and includes Fujian islands such as Kinmen, Matsu, as well as (at least in principle) Pratas Island (Tungsha/Dongsha) (part of Cijin District, Kaohsiung; claimed as part of Guangdong Province by the PRC) and Taiping Islands (assigned to Kaohsiung by ROC, and to Sansha and Hainan by PRC). In 2017 Xinhua News Agency issued guidelines mandating no scare quotes for all members of local governments of Taiwan authorities (except Fujian and Lienchiang) and preferring the term "Taiwan Area" over the term "Taiwan Province, People's Republic of China", since the latter does not include the Kinmen and Matsu islands.

=== Administrative divisions ===
Overview of administrative divisions of the Republic of China
Republic of China
Free area (Note: Also known as the Taiwan area or Tai–Min area (Chinese: 臺閩地區; lit. 'Taiwan–Fujian area'))					Mainland area (Note: The mainland area consists of Mainland China, Tibet and (previously) Outer Mongolia)
Special municipalities (Note: Has an elected executive and an elected legislative council.) (Note: Special municipalities, cities, and county-administered cities are all called shi (Chinese: 市; lit. 'city'))		Provinces (Note: Nominal; provincial governments have been abolished)			Not administered (Note: Constitutionally having the same structure as the free area, these are currently under the Chinese Communist Party control with a different structure)
Special municipalities		Counties		Autonomous municipalities (Note: Sometimes called cities (Chinese: 市) or provincial cities (Chinese: 省轄市) to distinguish them from special municipalities and county-administered cities)	Not administered
Districts (Note: Has an appointed district administrator for managing local affairs and carrying out tasks commissioned by superior agency.)	Mountain indigenous districts	County- administered cities	Townships (Note: There are two types of townships: rural townships or xīang (Chinese: 鄉) and urban townships or zhèn (Chinese: 鎮))	Districts	Not administered
Villages (Note: Has an elected village administrator for managing local affairs and carrying out tasks commissioned by superior agency.) (Note: Villages in rural townships are known as cūn (Chinese: 村), those in other jurisdictions are known as lǐ (Chinese: 里))					Not administered
Neighborhoods					Not administered

== See also ==
- Additional Articles of the Constitution of the Republic of China
- Anti-Secession Law of the People's Republic of China
- Constitution of the Republic of China
- History of the Republic of China
- Kuomintang
- Mainland China
- Politics of the Republic of China
- Soviet Zone / Liberated Zone
  - Chinese Soviet Republic
- Taiwan Province, People's Republic of China

== Notes ==
Words in native languages
