= Ye Laishi =

- 叶籁士
- Born: Bao Shuyuan; 21 May 1911; Wu County, Jiangsu, Qing dynasty
- Died: 2 February 1994 (aged 82); Beijing, China
- Occupations: Linguist, publisher, language reformer, Esperanto activist
- Known for: Chinese character rationalization, Pinyin, Esperanto movement
- Political party: Chinese Communist Party
- Spouse: Yin Guoxiu

Ye Laishi (Chinese: 叶籁士; 21 May 1911 – 2 February 1994), born Bao Shuyuan (Chinese: 包叔元), was a Chinese linguist, publisher, Esperanto activist, and language reformer from Wu County, Jiangsu. He played an important role in China's language reform movement. He became involved in the Latinxua Sin Wenz movement at an early age and later became one of the principal organizers of language reform in the People's Republic of China, including the simplification of Chinese characters, the promotion of Standard Chinese, and the formulation and implementation of Pinyin. He served as deputy secretary of the Party Leadership Group and executive vice director of the Chinese Script Reform Committee. He was also an important advocate and leader of the Chinese Esperanto movement.

== Names ==
Ye Laishi's birth name was Bao Shuyuan. In the 1930s, he began using Ĵelezo as his Esperanto pen name and Ye Laishi as his Chinese pen name, and became widely known by these names. Both names were derived from the Russian word железо (železo), meaning "iron". He also used several other pen names, including Bao Suoyuan, Luo Dianhua, Pan Gugan, and Yu Xuewen.

== Biography ==
=== Early life ===
Ye Laishi was born as Bao Shuyuan in 1911 in Suzhou, Jiangsu, then part of Wu County. During his secondary school years, he studied at several schools in Suzhou and Shanghai. Influenced by writings by Hu Yuzhi and others, he developed an interest in Esperanto and learned the language through correspondence courses in 1927. While attending Lida Academy in Shanghai, he was influenced by teachers such as Xia Mianzun and Feng Zikai, which led him to decide to study in Japan. In 1929, he was admitted to the Tokyo Higher Normal School. During his time in Japan, he attended advanced Esperanto courses organized by Japanese left-wing groups and joined the Tokyo branch of the League of Left-Wing Writers. Following the Mukden Incident in 1931, he discontinued his studies and returned to China.

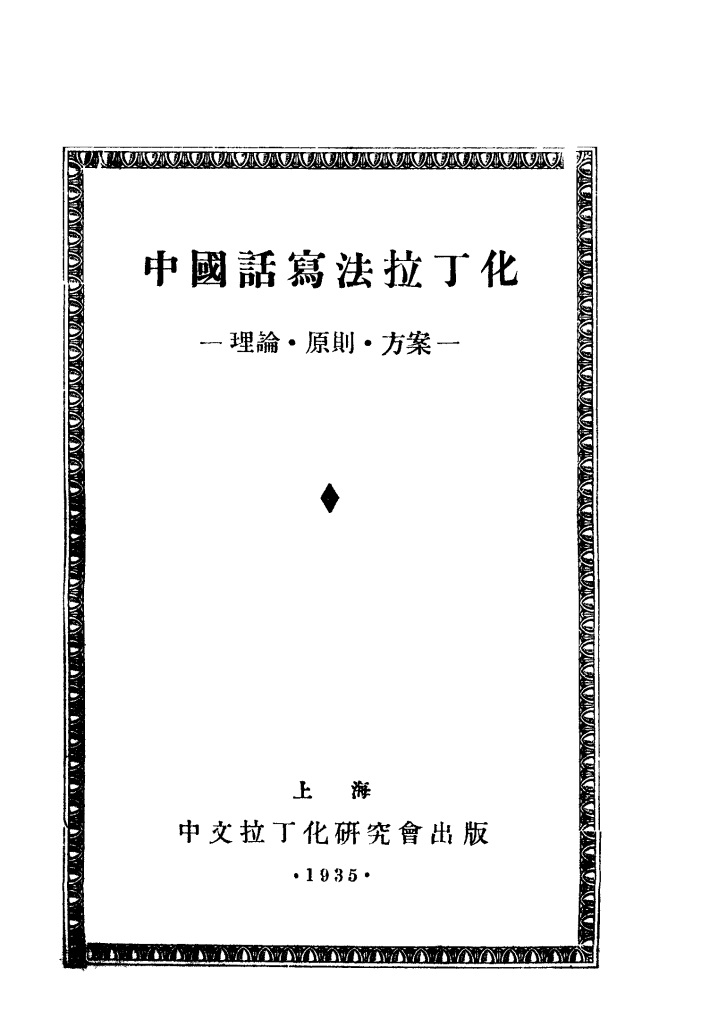
Cover of Chinese Writing in Latinization: Theory, Principles and Scheme (Chinese title: 中国话写法拉丁化——理论·原则·方案)

=== Esperanto and Latinization activities ===
In December 1931, the Chinese Left-Wing Esperanto League was founded in Shanghai. Like the League of Left-Wing Writers, it was affiliated with the China League of Left-Wing Cultural Organizations. Bao Shuyuan was one of its initiators, and in February 1932 he moved to Shanghai to work for the league full-time. Because of its left-wing political orientation, the league could not operate publicly. In 1933, the Shanghai Esperanto Association was founded as a public Esperanto organization. Bao became one of its principal leaders and edited its journal La Mondo, which was one of the most influential Esperanto movement in China during the 1930s. He also edited 'China Roars'(Ĉinio Hurlas), a publication of the Chinese branch of the Proletarian Esperanto Correspondence (PEK). It was during this period that he began using the pen name Ye Laishi.

In 1931, a scheme for Latinxua Sin Wenz, drafted with the participation of Qu Qiubai, Wu Yuzhang, and others, was approved in the Soviet Union to improve literacy among overseas Chinese laborers living there. Due to the absence of formal diplomatic relations between China and the Soviet Union at the time, developments related to the movement remained largely unknown in China. In October 1933, after learning of the Latinxua Sin Wenz movement, Ye Laishi placed a notice in Language Science, a supplement of La Mondo, seeking materials from Soviet Esperantists. He subsequently received scheme documents, principles, textbooks, dictionaries, reading materials, and newspapers sent by supporters. In 1934, Ye published Dazhongyu, Tuyu, Latinization in Dongxiang, a supplement of the Zhonghua Daily, formally introducing Latinxua Sin Wenz to readers in China. He also founded the Chinese Latinization Research Society, the first organization in China dedicated to the movement. He compiled and published Chinese Writing in Latinization: Theory, Principles and Scheme (Chinese: 中国话写法拉丁化——理论·原则·方案) in 1935. The first systematic Chinese-language work introducing Latinxua Sin Wenz and one of the movement's most influential publications during its early period. He later revised and expanded it into Introduction to Latinization. He also compiled the Workers Latinization Textbook and the Latinization Textbook, among the earliest Latinxua Sin Wenz textbooks in China. Ye also edited Sin Wenz Monthly and Language, which were among the earliest semi-public and public periodicals in China devoted to the discussion of Chinese character reform.

=== Wartime activities ===
After the outbreak of the Second Sino-Japanese War in 1937, Ye left Shanghai and traveled through Hong Kong and Guangzhou to Wuhan, where he joined the Political Department of the National Military Council under the leadership of Zhou Enlai and Guo Moruo. There, he was responsible for international propaganda in Esperanto. In September 1938, he joined the Chinese Communist Party, introduced by Feng Naichao and Hu Sheng. After the fall of Wuhan, he relocated through Changsha, Xiangtan, Hengxshan, and Guilin before arriving in Chongqing. In 1939, he founded the Esperanto periodical China Herald(Heroldo de Ĉinio), which circulated in 850 cities across 63 countries. During his time in Chongqing, he continued teaching and promoting Esperanto.

After the Wannan Incident in 1941, Ye was ordered by the Communist Party to withdraw to Hong Kong. Following the outbreak of the Pacific War and the fall of Hong Kong, he was trapped in Kowloon before being rescued by the Dongjiang Column. He later moved to Guangdong, Guilin, and eventually returned to Shanghai in 1943, where he remained until 1945.

=== Publishing career ===
In 1945, Ye Laisi was assigned by the Communist Party organization to the Huainan Anti-Japanese Base Area, where he joined the New Fourth Army and served as deputy director of its propaganda department's editorial section. In early 1946, after the headquarters of the New Fourth Army relocated to Linyi, Shandong, and merged with the Shandong Military Region to form the Shandong Field Army, Ye became deputy manager and director of the editorial department of the Shandong branch of Xinhua Bookstore. During this period, he edited Xinhua Digest. Following the reorganization of the Shandong Field Army and the Central China Field Army into the East China Field Army, the Shandong Xinhua Bookstore was restructured as the East China Xinhua Bookstore. After the Communist capture of Shanghai, Ye entered Shanghai with the East China Xinhua Bookstore and participated in the takeover of Cheng Chung Book Company. The East China Xinhua Bookstore was later reorganized as the East China General Branch of Xinhua Bookstore. In January 1951, under a restructuring plan implemented by the General Administration of Press and Publication, the editorial, publishing, printing, and distribution functions of Xinhua Bookstore were separated nationwide. The editorial and publishing departments of the East China General Branch were spun off to establish the Shanghai People's Publishing House, with Ye serving as its founding president.

In December 1952, Ye was transferred to Beijing and appointed first vice president and first deputy editor-in-chief of the People's Publishing House. Because its president and editor-in-chief, Hu Sheng, was concurrently engaged in work for the Publicity Department of the Chinese Communist Party, he rarely participated in the publisher's day-to-day affairs. As a result, Ye was effectively responsible for overseeing its daily operations.

=== Script reform career ===
In January 1954, Ye was transferred to the Publicity Department of the Chinese Communist Party and concurrently served as deputy director of the Institute of Linguistics of the Chinese Academy of Social Sciences. He was also appointed to the Chinese Script Reform Research Committee. In December of the same year, he became a member of the newly established State Language Commission, a body directly under the State Council of China.

In January 1955, Ye was appointed secretary-general of the committee. He became a vice director in August 1959 and deputy secretary of the Party leadership group in 1961. Because the committee's director, Wu Yuzhang, and vice directors Hu Yuzhi, Wei Que, and Ding Xilin concurrently held other leadership positions, Ye was responsible for much of the committee's day-to-day administration and coordinated many of the practical aspects of Chinese character rationalization, including the simplification of Chinese characters, the promotion of Standard Chinese, and the formulation and implementation of the Pinyin. He organized the National Conference on Script Reform in 1955 and coordinated the work of specialist committees that prepared such documents as the 'Chinese Character Simplification Scheme', the 'First List of Processed Variant Chinese Characters', the 'General List of Simplified Chinese Characters', the 'List of Printed Forms of Commonly Used Chinese Characters', and the 'Pinyin'. He also participated in drafting several reports on script reform and the promotion of Hanyu Pinyin. In addition to his administrative responsibilities, Ye served on several specialist bodies of the committee, including the Hanyu Pinyin Scheme Committee and the seven-member group responsible for revising simplified Chinese characters.

Following the outbreak of the Cultural Revolution in 1966, script reform work largely came to a halt. Ye was denounced as a “capitalist roader” and was sent to May Seventh Cadre School in Pingluo County, Ningxia, and Jingchuan County, Gansu. In March 1972, he returned to Beijing and organized the Script Reform Office of the Chinese Academy of Sciences. In 1973, the office was transferred to the State Council's Science and Education Group and resumed the name of the Chinese Script Reform Committee, with Ye placed in charge of its work. In 1980, he was appointed vice director of the committee. He later chaired the revision committee for the draft 'Second round of simplified Chinese characters' and served as director of the committee on Chinese orthography.

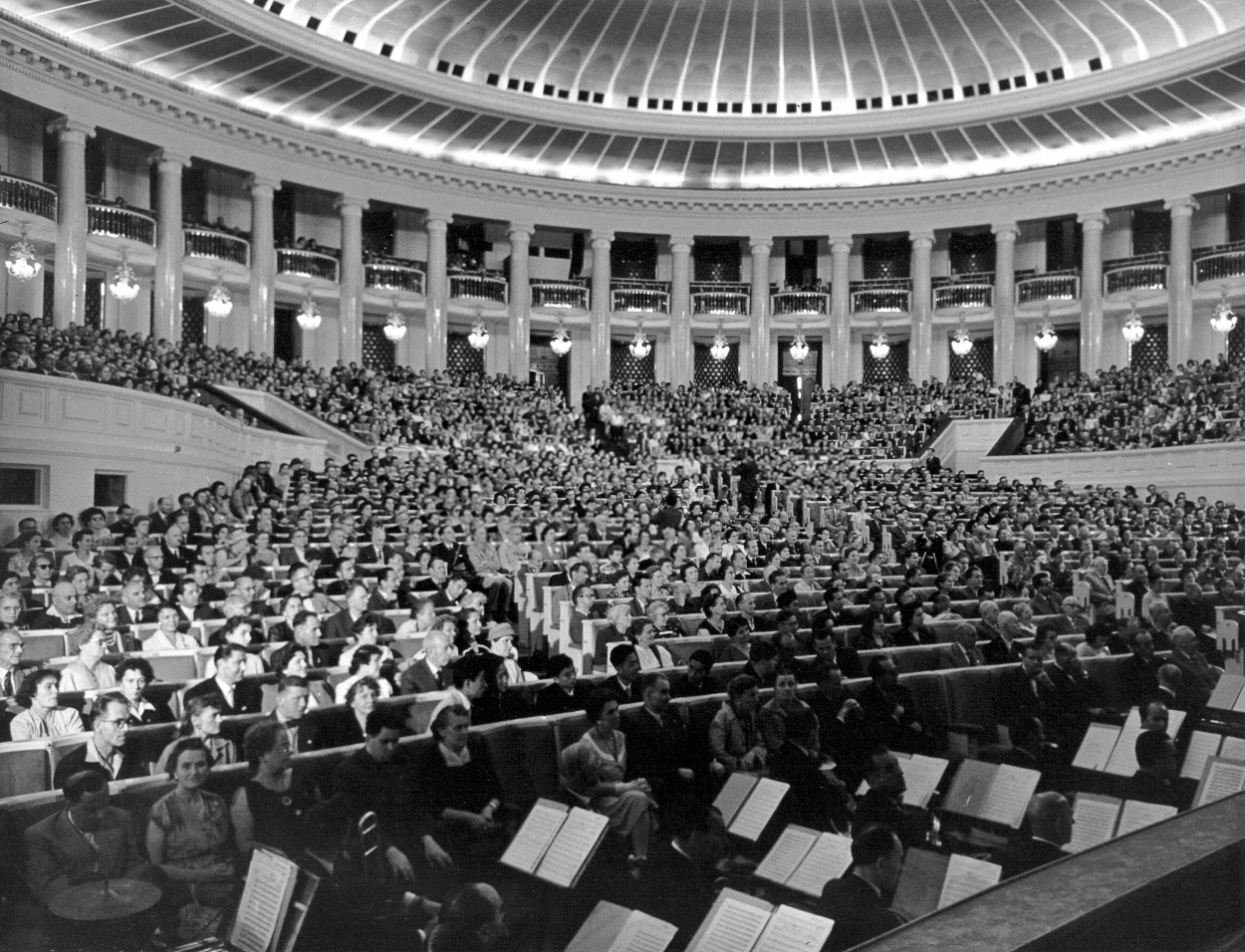
The 1959 World Esperanto Congress in Warsaw, Poland

Apart from his work on script reform, Ye was active in the Esperanto movement and in promoting Esperanto internationally in China. In 1956, he led a Chinese delegation to the 41st World Esperanto Congress in Copenhagen, marking the People's Republic of China's first participation in the congress. He subsequently attended the 44th congress in Warsaw in 1959 and the 49th congress in The Hague in 1964. In 1973, he led a delegation to the 60th Japanese Esperanto Congress in Kameoka, the first overseas visit by a Chinese Esperanto delegation after the Cultural Revolution. Ye served as a director, executive director, vice chairman, acting chairman, and honorary chairman of the China Esperanto League. He chaired the organizing committee of the 71st World Esperanto Congress, held in Beijing in 1986, and during the congress was elected an honorary member of the Universal Esperanto Associationduring the congress.

Following the Abolition of the lifetime tenure system for leading cadres, Ye became an adviser to the Chinese Script Reform Committee in 1984 and retired in 1987. He was a deputy to the 3rd National People's Congress, a delegate to the 11th National Congress of the Chinese Communist Party, and a member of the 5th National Committee of the Chinese People's Political Consultative Conference.

=== Later years and death ===
In 1977, Ye suffered a stroke that left him partially paralyzed on his left side, and his health remained poor thereafter. He died in Beijing on 2 February 1994 from multiple illnesses. In accordance with his will, his bone ashes were scattered in the Bohai Sea after cremation.

=== Other activities and contributions ===
In April 1937, the Japanese Esperantist Teru Hasegawa left Japan and traveled to Shanghai to participate in the Chinese anti-Japanese resistance movement, where she received assistance from Esperanto organizations. After the outbreak of the Second Sino-Japanese War, she was deported from China because of her Japanese nationality and became stranded in Hong Kong. After Ye reported her situation to higher authorities, she was granted special permission to re-enter China and subsequently participated in Japanese language radio broadcasts directed at Japanese troops in Wuhan and Chongqing.

Ye was an early advocate of horizontal writing in Chinese. While editing the journal Yuwen, he adopted horizontal typesetting, and after becoming first vice president of the People's Publishing House in 1952, he actively promoted the use of horizontal layout in Chinese books and periodicals. In October 1954, he published a series of articles in the Script Reform supplement of the Guangming Daily advocating horizontal writing and typesetting. On 1 January 1955, the Guangming Daily became the first national newspaper in China to adopt a left-to-right horizontal format. Beginning in December 1955, the Ministry of Culture (China) stipulated that Chinese books and magazines should generally be printed in horizontal format unless special circumstances required otherwise.

After the approval of the Pinyin scheme, Vice Premier Xi Zhongxun requested instruction in the system, and Ye personally taught him its use.

In early 1963, Ye serialized the self-study text Introduction to Hanyu Pinyin in the Guangming Daily. The work employed several innovative teaching methods, including treating the letters y and w as initials, reading syllables such as zhi, chi, and shi directly rather than spelling them out, and teaching the abbreviated forms iu, ui, and un instead of the underlying forms iou, uei, and uen. These methods were rapidly adopted in primary-school Pinyin instruction throughout China and remain in use today.

== Personal life ==
Ye's wife, Yin Guoxiu, was a native of Wuxi, Jiangsu. As a student at the Suzhou Women's Normal School, she participated in student movements. In April 1939, she joined the staff of the Life Bookstore in Chongqing and became a member of the Chinese Communist Party the following month through the introduction of her classmate Wu Quanheng. After the New Fourth Army Incident in 1941, she moved to the Hong Kong branch of the Life Bookstore and lived with Wu, whose husband Hu Sheng was a friend of Ye from the Chinese Esperanto movement. Following the Japanese occupation of Hong Kong, Yin was rescued by the East River Column and taken to Yangtaishan in Guangdong, where she met Ye. The couple moved to Guilin in 1942 and married there.

Yin later worked alongside Ye in publishing and editorial work in Shandong and Shanghai before spending the remainder of her career at the People's Publishing House, where she worked until retirement.

Ye and Yin had three children: a daughter, Ye Xi, and two sons, Ye Xiao and Ye Dan.

== Selected works ==
- Latinization of Written Chinese: Theory, Principles, and Proposals (中国话写法拉丁化——理论·原则·方案), 1935
- Latinized Textbook for Workers (工人用拉丁化课本), 1935
- Latinization Textbook (拉丁化课本), 1935
- Introduction to Latinization (拉丁化概论), 1935
- Questions and Answers on the Hanyu Pinyin Scheme (汉语拼音方案问答), 1958
- Introduction to Hanyu Pinyin (汉语拼音入门), 1964
- Chronological Biography of Ni Haishu (倪海曙年谱), published in Ni Haishu Yuwen Lunji (倪海曙语文论集), 1991
- An Evening Discussion on Simplified Chinese Characters (简化汉字一夕谈), 1995
