= Table of Comparison between Standard, Traditional and Variant Chinese Characters =

Chinese orthographic reference

The Table of Comparison between Standard, Traditional and Variant Chinese Characters (simplified Chinese: 规范字与繁体字、异体字对照表; traditional Chinese: 規範字與繁體字、異體字對照表; pinyin: Guīfàn zì yǔ fántǐ zì, yìtǐzì duìzhào biǎo) is the new standard of the PRC on the relationship between simplified, traditional and variant Chinese characters. It includes all the characters in the List of Commonly Used Standard Chinese Characters which have different forms in traditional or variant writing. The comparison table was built by integrating the General List of Simplified Chinese Characters and the First List of Processed Variant Chinese Characters.

== History ==
In December 1955, the Ministry of Culture and the Chinese Character Reform Committee of the PRC jointly announced the "First List of Processed Variant Characters" (第一批异体字整理表). It contained 810 groups of variant characters, totaling 1865 characters. According to the principle of following the common and simple, one character from each group was selected as the correct (or standard) form, and the rest are eliminated. After some later adjustments, the list now has 796 groups of variant characters, and 1,027 characters have been eliminated.

On 28 January 1956, the 23rd State Council Plenary Meeting passed the Resolution on the Promulgation of the "Chinese Character Simplification Scheme." On 31 January 1956, People's Daily published in full the Resolution and the Chinese Character Simplification Scheme (漢字簡化方案). The first list of the scheme was put into use nationwide on 1 February 1956, followed by the rest characters in batches.

In May 1964, the General List of Simplified Chinese Characters (简化字总表) was published by the Chinese Character Reform Press as a new standard list of simplified Chinese characters, which largely ratified and revised the 'Chinese Character Simplification Scheme. It was released again in 1986 with some revision, alongside the rescission of the Second round of simplified Chinese characters that had been announced in 1977. The General List of Simplified Chinese Characters includes three sub-lists with a total of 2274 simplified characters and 14 simplified components.

In 1988, the List of Commonly Used Characters in Modern Chinese (现代汉语通用字表, of 7,000 characters) developed by the department of Chinese characters of the State Language Commission was jointly released by the State Language Commission and the National Education Committee of the People's Republic of China.

In 2013, the List of Commonly Used Standard Chinese Characters (通用规范汉字表) was published to replace the List of Commonly Used Characters in Modern Chinese as the new standard for Chinese characters in the People's Republic of China.

The Table of Comparison between Standard, Traditional and Variant Chinese Characters (规范字与繁体字、异体字对照表), published as Attachment 1 of the List of Commonly Used Standard Chinese Characters, is the new standard on the relationship between simplified, traditional and variant Chinese characters. It includes all the standard characters in the List of Commonly Used Standard Chinese Characters which have different traditional or variant forms. The comparison table was built by integrating the "General List of Simplified Chinese Characters" and the "First List of Processed Variant Characters".

== Changes ==
Comparing with the previous standards, the changes of the Table of Comparison between Standard, Traditional and Variant Chinese Characters include

- In addition to the characters from the General List of Simplified Chinese Characters and the List of Commonly Used Characters in Modern Chinese, 226 groups of characters such as "髫, 𬬭, 𫖯" that are widely used in the society are included in the table.
- Based on the adjustment of variant characters in previous relevant standard documents, this table adjusts 45 variant characters in the "First List of Processed Variant Characters" into standardized characters, such as "薆, 倆, 淼, 生, 村".
- The new table itself does not mention how to use characters outside the table. However, the "Interpretation of the List of Commonly Used Standard Chinese Characters" states that unlimited analogy simplification "actually complicates and even confuses the overall system of Chinese characters... violates the principle of historical authenticity of the storage of Chinese characters in dictionaries, and widens the differences between the application of Chinese characters in ancient and modern times and between the two sides of the Taiwan Strait", and explains that "From now on, no analogy simplification will be used for characters beyond the table."

== Explanation ==
In front of the comparison table there are some explanations, which are summarized as follows.

1. This comparison table is compiled to guide the correct application of the List of Commonly Used Standard Chinese Characters, to facilitate the reading of ancient books, and to promote communication between the China mainland, Taiwan, Hong Kong and Macao. The use of traditional Chinese characters and variant characters follows the provisions of the Chinese language law.
2. This table lists 3,120 standard characters in the List of Commonly Used Standard Chinese Characters and their corresponding traditional Chinese characters and variant characters, arranged in three columns: the first column contains the standard characters and their serial numbers. The second column contains traditional Chinese characters, enclosed in parentheses. The third column contains variant characters, enclosed in square brackets.
3. This table contains 2,574 traditional Chinese characters corresponding to 2,546 standard characters. 96 groups of inter-character relationships in which one standard character corresponds to multiple traditional Chinese characters (or inherited characters) were decomposed. "~" in the table represents the same heritage characters as the standard characters. According to the provisions of "General List of Simplified Chinese Characters", some characters such as "瞭、乾、藉、麽" that are not simplified in some meanings and usages are explained with notes.
4. This table has adjusted the "First List of Processed Chinese Variant Characters" and includes 794 groups of 1,023 variant characters in total. For some variant characters such as "仝、甦、堃、脩" that can be used as standard characters in some meanings and usages, notes have been added to explain their scopes and usages.

== Disputes ==
Some one-simple-vs-multiple-traditional characters that are highly controversial have not been restored to standard, such as 後, 發, 隻, 鬥, 麺(麵).

In the previous simplification of Chinese characters, the analogy between traditional and simplified Chinese characters was not consistent for some reasons. For example, in addition to the simplification analogy of "车 (車)", "毂（轂)" still misses a horizontal line.

Professor Su Peicheng of Peking University objected to the "limited analogy" advocated by the "Interpretation of List of Commonly Used Standard Chinese Characters", and was particularly opposed to the abolition of the "General List of Simplified Chinese Characters". He believed that "the "General List" specifically stipulates the individual simplification and component analogy simplification relationship between Traditional and Simplified Chinese, if the "General List" is abolished, the relationship between Traditional and Simplified Chinese will become "water without a source and a tree without a root".
