= First List of Processed Variant Chinese Characters =

The First List of Processed Variant Chinese Characters (simplified Chinese: 第一批异体字整理表; traditional Chinese: 第一批異體字整理表; pinyin: Dìyīpī Yìtǐzì Zhěnglǐbiǎo) is a standard character selection list issued by the Ministry of Culture and the Chinese Character Reform Committee of the People's Republic of China in 1955. There were originally 810 groups of variant characters, among which 1,055 characters were eliminated. After some later adjustments, the list now has 796 groups, with 1,027 characters eliminated.

== History ==
In December 1955, the Ministry of Culture and the Chinese Character Reform Committee of the PRC jointly announced the "First List of Processed Variant Chinese Characters". This list contained 810 groups of variant characters, totaling 1865 characters. According to the principle of following the common and simple, one character from each group was selected as the standard form, and the rest (totally 1,055 variant characters) were eliminated. (Note: should be 1,053, because character "妳" and "粇" appeared twice)

On 23 March 1956, the Ministry of Culture and the Chinese Character Reform Committee issued the "Notice on Standardizing '坂' and '挫' in the First List of Variant Chinese Characters", restoring "坂" and "挫" to be standard characters.

According to the explanation of the "General List of Simplified Characters" re-published on 10 October 1986, the 11 analogous simplified characters "䜣、䜩、晔、詟、诃、䲡、䌷、刬、鲙、诓、雠" were confirmed as standard characters and no longer considered as obsolete variants.

According to the "Joint Notice on the Release of the List of Commonly Used Characters in Modern Chinese" issued by the State Language Commission and the Press and Publication Administration of the People's Republic of China on 25 March 1988, the 15 characters "翦、邱、於、澹、骼、彷、菰、溷、徼、薰、黏、桉、愣、晖、凋" were confirmed as standard characters and no longer considered as obsolete variants.

After the above adjustments, the first batch of variant characters was reduced from 810 groups to 796 groups, and the eliminated variant characters were reduced from 1053 to 1027.

On 3 September 1993, the State Language Commission's Writing Application Management Department issued a "Reply on the Use of Character '鎔'", restoring "鎔" to standard (and then simplified to "镕" by analogy). The re-arranged version published in 1997 also reduced some other variant characters.

On 5 June 2013, the State Council of the People's Republic of China announced the "List of Commonly Used Standard Chinese Characters" (通用规范汉字表) with Appendix 1 of Table of Comparison between Standard, Traditional and Variant Chinese Characters, which replaced the First List of Processed Chinese Variant Characters among some other related character lists and became the new standard.

== Usage and encoding ==
The eliminated variant characters are considered "non-standard Chinese characters" in mainland China, so most of them are not included in the national standard encoding; but because they are still used in other Chinese character regions, most of them have been included in the Unicode CJK Unified Ideographs. A small number of characters are not included uniquely partly because they are considered as different glyphs of the same character, for example, character "珊" and "珊" share the same Unicode U+73CA.

== The list ==
The following are some examples of variant groups which have been processed. (The characters before the brackets are selected and those in the brackets are eliminated):

冰[氷] (bīng, ice),
册[冊] (cè, copy),
村[邨] (cūn, village). 

The complete list of the revised version arranged by Chinese pinyin is available at this page, among which many eliminated variants are still commonly used in Hong Kong, Macau, Taiwan or some dialects.

== The second list ==
In June 1956, the Chinese Character Reform Committee compiled the "Second List of Precessed Variant Chinese Characters (Draft)", which included 605 groups of variant characters and eliminated 759 characters. After soliciting opinions, the Second List was printed in October, which included 595 groups of variant characters and eliminated 766 characters. In January 1957, the "First List" and the "Second List" were merged into the "List of Processed Variant Chinese Characters". In June of the same year, the Chinese Character Reform Committee decided to only consider characters with the same pronunciation and meaning but in different character shapes as variant characters, cancel characters with different pronunciations or meanings, and delete extremely rare ancient variant characters.

Variant character processing was carried out in 1959, 1962, and 1965, but the "List of Processed Variant Characters" was never published. At the end of 1976, the "Second List of Processed Variant Chinese Characters (Draft for Comments)" was formulated, and in May 1977, it was revised and renamed "List of Processed Variant Chinese Character (Draft for Comments)". However, the main task of the Chinese Character Reform Committee at that time was to formulate the Second round of simplified Chinese characters, so the processing of variant characters was stopped. As a result, neither the Second List nor the General List has ever been formally published.

== See also ==
- Chinese character rationalization
- Variant Chinese characters
