= Chinese simplification =

Chinese simplification may refer to:

- Simplified Chinese characters, standardised Chinese characters promulgated by the People's Republic of China
- Chinese Character Simplification Scheme, a scheme to introduce the simplified Chinese characters
- Shinjitai, simplified Chinese characters, or Kanji used in Japan
- Singapore Chinese characters, simplifications unique to Singapore

== See also ==
- Template:Table Hanzi
- Chinese characters
