= State Language Commission =

Official language regulator of China

The State Language Commission (Note: Simplified Chinese: 国家语言文字工作委员会; traditional Chinese: 國家語言文字工作委員會; abbreviated as 国家语委; 國家語委) (Note: Formerly known as the Chinese Character Reform Committee (中国文字改革委员会; 中國文字改革委員會 – abbreviated as 文改会; 文改會)) (SLC) is the official language regulator of China, managed by the Ministry of Education. It is mainly responsible for the standardization of national languages, and for implementing the policies and laws of the State Council on languages. The most important contributions by the SLC include the development and publication of Hanyu Pinyin (1958), the Chinese Character Simplification Scheme (1956), and the List of Commonly Used Standard Chinese Characters (2013).

== History ==
In August 1949, prior to the proclamation of the People's Republic of China, Wu Yuzhang wrote a letter to Mao Zedong, proposing that it was necessary to promptly carry out language reform in order to eliminate illiteracy. Mao replied with support to the proposal in the same month. In October 1949, the Chinese Language Reform Association was established. In December, Wu Yuzhang was appointed the chairman of the standing council of the association.

In October 1954, the Chinese Character Reform Association was reorganized into the Chinese Character Reform Committee directly under the State Council. Wu Yuzhang was the chairman, Hu Yuzhi was the vice chairman. On January 7, 1955, the Chinese Character Reform Committee issued the Draft Scheme for the Simplification of Chinese Characters. In February 1955, the Pinyin Scheme Committee of the Chinese Character Reform Committee was established, with Wu Yuzhang and Hu Yuzhi as the chairman and vice-chairmen. The members included Wei Que, Ding Xilin, Lin Handa, Luo Changpei, Lu Zhiwei, Li Jinxi, Wang Li, Ni Haishu, Ye Laishi, and Zhou Youguang. In September 1955, the Chinese Character Reform Committee proposed a revised draft for simplifying Chinese characters, which was reviewed by the State Council Chinese Character Simplification Scheme Review Committee and passed by the State Council plenary meeting on January 28, 1956. On January 31, 1956, the Chinese Character Simplification Scheme was officially announced by People's Daily. In December 1955, the Ministry of Culture and the Chinese Character Reform Committee of the PRC jointly announced the First List of Processed Variant Chinese Characters.

On November 1, 1957, the Scheme for the Chinese Phonetic Alphabet was approved by the State Council, and approved and officially adopted at the Fifth Session of the 1st National People's Congress on February 11, 1958. In May 1964, the General List of Simplified Chinese Characters was released by the Chinese Character Reform Committee. In December 1977, the Chinese Character Reform Committee issued the Second Chinese Character Simplification Scheme (Draft), which was rescinded in 1986. On December 16, 1985, the Chinese Character Reform Committee was renamed the State Language Commission (or National Language and Script Working Committee). It is a national bureau (vice-ministerial level) directly under the management of the Ministry of Education.

On October 31, 2000, the Law on the Standard Spoken and Written Language of the People’s Republic of China was adopted at the 18th meeting of the Standing Committee of the 9th National People's Congress, and came into effect on January 1, 2001. On June 4, 2013, the List of Commonly Used Standard Chinese Characters was issued by the SLC and MoE.

== Responsibilities ==
The mandate of the State Language Commission includes:

- Principles and policies for national language and writing work
- Medium- and long-term plans for language and writing work
- Norms and standards for Chinese and minority languages and writing and organize and coordinate supervision and inspection
- Promotion of Standard Chinese and the training of educators.

== Organizational structure ==
The State Language Commission has the following organizations:

- Language Application Management Department (语言文字应用管理司)
- Language Information Management Department (语言文字信息管理司)
- Institute of Language Applications
- Language Press
- National Language Commission Advisory Committee
- National Language Commission Language and Writing Standards Review Committee
- National Language Commission Scientific Research Planning Leading Group
- National Promotion of Putonghua Propaganda Week Leading Group
- Inter-ministerial Joint Conference System for Foreign Language Translation and Writing Standards and Chinese Ideological and Cultural Terminology Dissemination

== Academic Journal ==
Applied Linguistics (语言文字应用) is a quarterly academic journal founded in 1992. It is sponsored by the Ministry of Education of the People's Republic of China and run by the Research Institute of Language Application (语言文字应用研究所).

=== Main areas ===
Applied Linguistics covers the areas of Chinese information processing, language teaching, sociolinguistics, language application, language standards, and book reviews.

=== Readership ===
The readers of Applied Linguistics include Chinese language researchers and teachers, college students, secretarial workers, etc.

=== Ranks ===
- Source journal of Chinese Social Sciences Citation Index (CSSCI 2021-2022)
- Source journal of “Overview of Chinese Core Journals” by Peking University.

== Successive leaders ==
- Liu Daosheng (刘导生)
- Chen Yuan (陈原)
- Liu Bin (柳斌)
- Xu Jialu (许嘉璐)
- Lin Yanzhi (林炎志)
- Zhu Xinjun (朱新均)
- Wang Zhan (王湛)
- Yuan Guiren (袁贵仁)
- Li Weihong (李卫红, May 2010-May 2015)
- Tian Xuejun (田学军, May 2019-January 2023)
- Chen Jie (陈杰, August 2023-)

== See also ==
- National Languages Committee
