= Chinese character rationalization =

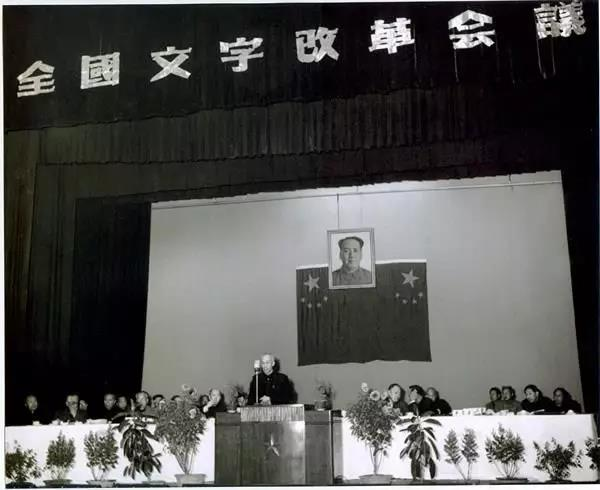
Yuzhang Wu addressing The first National Writing Reform Conference in Beijing, October 1955

The goal of Chinese character rationalization or Chinese character optimization (traditional Chinese: 漢字整理; simplified Chinese: 汉字整理; pinyin: hànzì zhěnglǐ) is to, in addition to Chinese character simplification, optimize the Chinese characters and set up one standard form for each of them (and its variants).

Many achievements in character optimization have been made in processing of variant Chinese characters, printing fonts, uncommon characters in place names, and characters for some measurement units.

== Processing variant characters ==
Variant characters (traditional Chinese: 異體字; simplified Chinese: 异体字; pinyin: yìtǐzì), or variants, have two meanings:

1. Characters with the same function (that is, the same pronunciation and meaning) but different forms are variants of each other.
2. Characters of different forms from but the same function as the standard character.
3. The variant characters that have not been officially processed take the former definition, and the variant characters that have been processed and standardized take the latter definition.

The differences among variants may appear at the component level. For example,

1. "綫" and "線" (xiàn, line), the right components are different.
2. "夠" and "够" (gòu, enough), components in different arrangement.

Or on the level of whole characters. For example,

1. "罪" and "辠" (zuì, sin)
2. "它 and "牠" (tā, it).

The existence of variant characters results in multiple forms for one character, which increases the burden of language learning and application. In the process of Chinese characters application, people need to constantly process variant characters and eliminate inappropriate ones.

=== Principles ===
There are two different principles for processing variant characters: One is conforming to the customs and simplicity. "Conforming to the customs" means discarding the rare and retaining the familiar, and choosing glyphs that are more popular in society. "Simplicity" means choosing a form with fewer strokes. The other principle is to follow the original form and meaning, based on the character creation method and etymology, especially Shuowen Jiezi.

Mainland China mainly adopts the principle of "conforming to customs and simplicity" in processing variant characters. For example,

1. Conforming to the customs: 针[鍼] (zhēn, needle), 仙[僊] (xiān, immortal), 脚[腳] (jiǎo, foot).
2. Conforming to simplicity: 笋[筍] (sǔn, bamboo shoots), 猫[貓] (māo, cat), 捆[綑] (kǔn, bundle), 升[陞昇] (shēng, rise),

where the character outside the square brackets are standard characters. If conformity to the customs and simplicity are inconsistent, the customs are often followed. For example: 霸[覇] (bà, overlord), 船[chuán, 舩] (boat), 捍[扞] (hàn, defend). The principle of following the customs and being simple is easy to be accepted by the people and easy to implement.

In Taiwan, processing of variant characters is mainly based on the original meanings and forms. For example:

For the variant character "笋筍" (sǔn, bamboo shoots), character "筍" in "Shuowen Jiezi" is selected, following semantic component 竹 (bamboo) and phonetic component 旬 (xún).

Among variants "猫" and "貓" (māo, cat), have selected "貓" (semantic 豸 and phonetic 苗 (miáo). The character 豸 (zhì) in Oracle Bone inscriptions is like a beast.

The advantage of considering the original meaning and form is to respect the historical tradition and the rationales of character formation.

=== Methods ===
There are two methods for processing variant characters: selection and splitting. The selection method is to select one of the variant characters as the standard character and eliminate the rest. For example:

1. Among variants "蝶蜨" (dié, butterfly), selected "蝶" and eliminate "蜨";
2. Among "藤籐" (téng, vine), selected "藤" and eliminate "籐".

The splitting method is to differentiate a group of variant characters in terms of usage to eliminate the variant relationship. For example, change

1. 帐, zhàng: (1) tent, (2) account.
2. 账, zhàng: (1) tent, (2) account.

into

1. 帐, zhàng: tent.
2. 账, zhàng: account.

=== First List of Processed Variant Characters ===
In December 1955, the Ministry of Culture and the Chinese Character Reform Committee of the PRC jointly announced the "First List of Processed Variant Characters" (第一批异体字整理表). This list contained 810 groups of variant characters, totaling 1865 characters. According to the principle of following the common and simple, one character from each group was selected as the correct (or standard) form, and the rest are eliminated. For example: 冰[氷] (bīng, ice), 册[冊] (cè, copy), 村[邨] (cūn, village). The characters before brackets are selected to be the standard form.

After some later adjustments, the "First List of Processed Variant Characters" now has 796 groups of variant characters, and 1,027 characters have been eliminated.

== Processing printing fonts ==
In the 1950s, there were some characters with different forms within the Song fonts, and between Song fonts, Kai fonts and other fonts, such as "决決" and "奥奧", etc., which brought inconvenience to typing and typesetting of Chinese characters. In 1955, the Chinese Cultural Reform Commission set up a standard font research group to study the fonts for unified printing typefaces. In January 1965, the Ministry of Culture and the Cultural Reform Commission of PRC issued the "Joint Notice on Unifying Chinese Character Glyphs" and issued the "印刷通用汉字字形表" (General Chinese Character Forms for Printing), "字形表" (Font Table) in short, asking all places to gradually implement it. The "Font Table" contains 6196 commonly used Song-style characters for printing. In accordance with the principles of simplicity, convenience for learning and use, a standard form was specified for each common character, including the number of strokes, structure and stroke order.

After the "Cultural Revolution", the "Font Table" was formally published. The glyphs specified by it are now customarily called "new character forms", while the fonts used before were called "old character forms". The "New and Old Character Form Comparison Table" (新旧字形对照表) in many language reference books including Xinhua Dictionary and Xiandai Hanyu Dictionary are compiled and printed based on this "Font Table".

=== Principles of font processing ===
The principles are:

- Easy to read and write (horizontally)
- Song script is as close to Regular script as possible
- Change the folded (or bended) strokes to straight strokes as much as possible
- Try to convert broken strokes into continuous strokes

etc.

=== Specific font changes ===
Specific character form changes include:

- Change horizontal points, vertical points, and pie (㇓) points to points "丶", for example, 言[言]、安[安]、户[戶].
- Change some of the na (㇏) strokes to points (㇔), such as the dian (丶) in the left 木 of 林.
- Link two strokes into one, for example: 差[差], 鬼[鬼], 及[及], 花[花].
- Unify similar-looking parts, such as: 兑[兌兑], 半[半].
- Reduce strokes, for example: 吕[呂], 争[爭], 奥[奧], 過[過].
- Divide the similar components according to their pronunciation. For example: characters "肺沛" etc. characters which are pronounced with the ei rhyme are written with component "巿" (fú), and "柿铈" etc. characters in shi rhyme use component "市" （shì）.
- Change the folded strokes into straight strokes, for example: 吴[吳], 直[直].
- Others, such as 默[黙], 拔[拔], 丰[丰], 反[反], 丑[丑], 角[角], 内[內], 全[全], 骨[骨], etc.

=== Discussion ===
There are pros and cons. The advantages of "Font Table" include:

Standardized the different forms of each character to eliminate glyph confusion. Some characters now have fewer strokes, and some have changed stroke forms to further facilitate writing and reading. The number of characters involved is quite large, and the common Chinese character glyphs have been comprehensively improved.

However, "Following the crowd and following the custom" weakens the rationales for some characters. For example, component "次" in characters "羡" (admire) and "盗" (pirates) originally used three dots on the left (羨, 盜), and was a variant of "涎" (mouth water) and was the semantic component. After changing it to "次" (times), it became a pure form component.

Some connected strokes, such as: 象[象,] 鬼[鬼], etc., have increased character components, making it inconvenient for character form analysis.

Some changes don't seem necessary. For example: 反[反], 丰[丰]. The first stroke of "反" is changed from heng (㇐) to pie (㇓), and the first stroke of "丰" is changed from pie (㇓) to heng (㇐).

=== Current font standards ===
In China mainland, there is the List of Commonly Used Standard Chinese Characters (通用规范汉字表), issued by the State Council on June 5, 2013. The characters are in font Song.

In Taiwan there is the Standard Form of National Characters. The characters are in font Kai.

According to experiment results, among the 4,786 commonly used characters, there are 2,839 characters with more or less differences between China mainland and Taiwan, accounting for 59% of the total number of characters.

The standard adopted by the Hong Kong education sector is the List of Graphemes of Commonly-Used Chinese Characters (常用字字形表). The characters were originally handwritten, then changed to font Kai.

In addition, there are the list of Jōyō kanji for Japan, and the Kangxi Dictionary (de facto) for Korea.

== Names of places ==
In order to make place names easier to use, the Chinese government started to process the uncommon characters used in place names in 1950s. The criteria for judging rare characters in place names are:

1. This character is unfamiliar to most people in the country.
2. This character is rarely used in other situations except for place names.
3. Or the strokes are too complex and difficult to write.

The principles for choosing replacement characters are:

1. Same pronunciation and clear,
2. More commonly used,
3. Simple and easy to write,
4. A standard character that is popular in the local area,
5. Not to be confused with other place names.

From March 1955 to August 1964, 35 place names of county level or above were changed with the approval of the State Council. For example:

- "铁骊县" (Tieli County) was changed to "铁力县" (Tieli County),
- "鄱阳县" (Poyang County) was changed to "波阳县" (Boyang County),
- "和阗专区" (Hedian Prefecture) was changed to "和田专区" (Hetian Prefecture).
- "酆都县" (Fengdu County) was changed to "丰都县" (Fengdu County).
- "瑷珲县" (Aihui County) was changed to "爱辉县" (Aihui County).

Later, in order to maintain the stability of place names, this work was suspended.

== Measurement words ==
When the English units of measurement were translated into Chinese, there were inconsistencies in the use of characters. For example:

1. mile: 英里 or 哩.
2. foot: 英尺, 呎.
3. ounce: 盎司, 温司, 唡, 英两.
4. kilowatt: 千瓦, 瓩.

Therefore, the burden of language application was increased. "哩, 呎, 唡", etc., are specially created characters, and they also have poly-syllable sounds, which does not follow the monosyllable pattern of Chinese characters. (If pronounced with a single syllable, it may be confused with the Chinese local units, such as 呎 (yīngchǐ, chǐ) and 尺 (chǐ).

In order to solve these problems, in July 1977, the Chinese Character Reform Commission and the National Bureau of Standards and Measures of PRC jointly issued the "Notice on the Uniform Use of Characters in the Names of Some Measurement Units" (关于部分计量单位名称统一用字的通知), establishing the metric system as the basic measurement system.

The Notice stated:

In order to clarify the confusion in the terminology of units of measurement, eliminate the artificial obstacles in the use of special characters in the names of units of measurement, and achieve the unification, the characters used in the names of some units of measurement are specially unified (see attached table). ... From the date of receipt of this document, all publications, printed documents, design charts, product packaging, and broadcasts should use the translations selected in the attached table and eliminate other old translations. Inventory packaging materials do not need to be changed before reprinting. External documents and trademarks of export goods that have been registered in foreign countries do not need to be changed."

== Other words ==
In China Mainland, different glyphs of the same character that are very different from each other are put into the "第一批异体字整理表" (First List of Processed Variant Characters), and those that are slightly different are included in "新旧字形对照表" (Old and New Glyphs Cross-reference Table). In Hong Kong and Taiwan, different glyphs of the same character, even if they are only slightly different, are all classified as variant characters.
