= Language Press =

Chinese publishing company

Language Press (simplified Chinese: 语文出版社; traditional Chinese: 語文出版社; pinyin: Yǔwén Chūbǎnshè), formerly the Chinese Character Reform Press, is a publishing company in the People's Republic of China. Its business includes educational publishing, dictionary and academic works publishing, popular culture book publishing and digital publishing.

== History ==
In 1956, the Chinese Character Reform Press (文字改革出版社) was established directly under the Chinese Character Reform Committee (now called State Language Commission). It was the only professional language publishing house in the country. Its early stage presidents included Hu Yuzhi and Lu Shuxiang. In 1980, the publishing house was renamed Language Press.

In 2000, it merged with Language Audio-visual Publishing House and Language Newspaper and Periodical Press to form the new Language Press; in 2010, it became a member unit of China Education Publishing and Media Group Co., Ltd under the Ministry of Education.

The company published the first batch of pinyin reading materials (汉语拼音读物) in China, the first General List of Simplified Chinese Characters, the first textbook on varieties of Chinese language varieties Outline of Chinese Dialects (汉语方言概要), and the first dictionary to strictly implement the national language and writing standards the Standard Dictionary of Modern Chinese Application (现代汉语应用规范词典), etc.

== Publishing areas ==
The company majors in language and education. The main publishing areas include: educational publishing such as preschool education, primary and secondary school Chinese education, vocational education, etc.; professional publishing such as dictionaries, normative standards and academic works; and popular publishing such as traditional culture and social culture.

== Subsidiaries ==
The Subsidiaries include:

- "Language and Characters Newspaper" (语言文字报)
- "Language Construction" magazine (语文建设)
- Chinese Language Bookstore (语文书店)
