= General List of Simplified Chinese Characters =

1964 Chinese character standard

The General List of Simplified Chinese Characters (simplified Chinese: 简化字总表; traditional Chinese: 簡化字總表; pinyin: Jiǎnhuàzì zǒngbiǎo) was the standard list of simplified Chinese characters published in China in 1964. It largely ratified and revised the Chinese Character Simplification Scheme promulgated in 1956, and served as the main reference for the List of Commonly Used Standard Chinese Characters published in 2013. The General List of Simplified Chinese Characters was released again in 1986 with some revision, alongside the rescission of the second round of simplified Chinese characters that had been announced in 1977. The General List of Simplified Chinese Characters includes three sub-lists with a total of 2274 simplified characters and 14 simplified components.

== History ==
=== Publication ===
On 7 January 1964, the Chinese Character Reform Committee submitted a "Request for Instructions on the Simplification of Chinese Characters" to the State Council, mentioning that "due to the lack of clarity on analogy simplification in the original Chinese Character Simplification Scheme (汉字简化方案), there is some disagreement and confusion in the application field of publication”.

On 24 February 1964, the State Council instructed: "The simplified characters listed in the "Chinese Character Simplification Scheme" should be similarly simplified when used as pianpang components in other characters; the components listed in the scheme, except for '讠、饣、糸、钅', should also be simplified when used as independent characters." In May 1964, based on this instruction and on the basis of the "Chinese Character Simplification Scheme", the Chinese Character Reform Committee edited and published the "General List of Simplified Chinese Characters".

=== Second Chinese Character Simplification Scheme (Draft) ===
In December 1977, the Chinese Character Reform Committee issued the "Second Chinese Character Simplification Scheme (Draft)". The draft was not discussed by members of the Chinese Character Reform Committee before it was released. After it was released, all parties in the society expressed many opinions. It was generally believed that the number of simplified characters was too large and that some simplified characters were not mature enough. The Chinese Character Reform Committee made many revisions, but never satisfactory.

On 25 February 1986, the State Language Commission submitted to the State Council the "Request for Instructions on Abolition of the 'Second Chinese Character Simplification Plan (Draft)' and Correcting the Confusion of Chinese Characters in Society". In June 1986, the State Council approved the abolition of this draft and instructed: "In the future, we should be cautious about the simplification of Chinese characters, so that the forms of Chinese characters can remain relatively stable for a period of time, so as to facilitate social application."

=== Re-publication ===
In October 1986, the State Language Commission re-published the General List of Simplified Chinese Characters with some improvements. On 5 June 2013, the State Council of the People's Republic of China announced the List of Commonly Used Standard Chinese Characters with Appendix 1 of Table of Comparison between Standard, Traditional and Variant Chinese Characters, which was built upon the General List of Simplified Chinese Characters among some other related character lists and became the new standard. However, the General List remain a milestone in Chinese language history and a useful reference for simplified Chinese education.

== Controversy ==
Paleophilologist Chen Mengjia said: Writing needs to be simple, but not confusing. The most common problems with these simplified characters are homophone substitution and pianpang omission. After simplification, some characters are confused. For example, "回（迴)", the character "迴" is the differentiated character produced by "回" plus "辶", which means "whirlwind", this is the result of development. Du Fu's poem "渚清沙白鳥飛迴" is written in simplified Chinese characters as "渚清沙白鸟飞回", where "飞回" will inevitably make people misunderstand as "flying back".

In addition, some simplified characters are more controversial. For example, "罴" is a kind of bear. According to the etymology, it is "罒+熊" (the character "熊" is not simplified), in the list, it was simplified to "罴" based on the analogy of "罢（罷）", resulting in unclear meaning. Other examples: "聖" is simplified to "圣", "僅" is simplified to "仅", "鳳" is simplified to "凤", "風" is simplified to "风", etc., among which "乂" and "又" tend to be "symbolized".

== See also ==
- Chinese Character Simplification Scheme
- List of Commonly Used Standard Chinese Characters
- Table of Comparison between Standard, Traditional and Variant Chinese Characters
