= Singapore Chinese characters =

Chinese characters as simplified in Singapore

The development of Singapore's Chinese characters can be divided into three periods.

== History ==
Before 1969, Singapore used traditional Chinese characters. From 1969, the Ministry of Education promulgated the Table of Simplified Characters (simplified Chinese: 简体字表; traditional Chinese: 簡體字表; pinyin: jiǎntǐzì biǎo), which differed from the Chinese Character Simplification Scheme of the People's Republic of China. After 1976, Singapore fully adopted the simplified Chinese characters of the People's Republic of China. In 1977, the second attempt to simplify the characters was stopped, ending the long period of confusion associated with simplification.

== 1969 Table of Simplified Characters ==
The 1969 Table of Simplified Characters was also known as the "502 Table of Simplified Characters" or simply "502". This table listed a total of 502 commonly used Simplified Characters. It contains 11 characters unique to Singapore, 38 characters simplified in different ways compared to that of mainland China, and 29 characters whose left or right radical were not simplified.

Simplification examples are as follows:

- 要 → 𡚩
- 信 → 伩
- 窗 → 囪
- 貌 → 皃
- 嘴 → 咀
- 留 → 畄
- 答 → 荅
- 覆 → 覄
- 算 → 祘
- 解 → 觧
- 剎 → 杀

Different ways of simplification as compared to those of mainland China

- 槟 → 梹
- 拨 → 𫝼
- 场 → 㘯
- 斗 → 鬥 (not simplified for the meaning of "fight")
- 读 →
- 谏 →
- 亚 → 亜
- 恶 → 悪
- 发 → 発
- 飞 → 𮨶
- 废 → 廃
- 无 →
- 芜 →
- 抚 →
- 复 → 覄
- 关 → 𬮦
- 国 → 囯
- 划 → 㓰
- 开 → 𫔭
- 裤 → 衭
- 来 → 耒
- 丽 → 丽
- 卖 →
- 泼 → 溌
- 让 → 誏
- 赛 → 𡧳
- 狮 → 𤞏
- 赎 →
- 肃 → 粛
- 岁 → 𭭚
- 台 → 枱 (meaning "table")
- 团 →
- 萧 → 䔥
- 箫 → 簘
- 续 →
- 杂 →
- 职 → 聀
- 纸 → 帋

Radicals which are not simplified:

- 纲 → 䋄
- 经 →
- 练 →
- 绳 → 䋲
- 线 →
- 药 → 葯
- 绘 → 絵
- 继 → 継
- 织 → 𥿗
- 观 → 覌
- 觉 → 覚
- 览 →
- 缆 →
- 贱 →
- 质 → 貭
- 颈 →
- 饥 → 飢
- 讥 → 𮗸
- 讲 → 𮗻
- 识 → 䛊
- 译 →
- 议 →
- 证 → 証
- 鸡 → 鳮
- 骄 →
- 验 →
- 钱 →
- 铁 → 鉄
- 钟 → 鈡

== See also ==
- Singaporean Mandarin
- Languages of Singapore
- Simplified Chinese characters
- Shinjitai, for the specific forms of simplified Chinese characters used in Japan
- Variant Chinese characters (or itaiji)
