= Differences between Shinjitai and Simplified characters =

Differences between shinjitai and simplified characters in the Japanese and Chinese languages exist.

== List of different simplifications ==
The old and new forms of the kyōiku kanji and their hànzì equivalents are listed below.

In the following lists, the characters are sorted by the radicals of the Japanese kanji. The two Kokuji 働 and 畑 in the Kyōiku Kanji List, which have no Chinese equivalents, are not listed here; in Japanese, neither character was affected by the simplifications.

- No simplification in either language

(The following characters were simplified neither in Japanese nor in Chinese.)

一 丁 下 三 不 天 五 民 正 平 可 再 百 否 武 夏 中 内 出 本 世 申 由 史 冊 央 向 曲 印 州 表 果 半 必 永 求 九 丸 千 久 少 夫 午 失 末 未 包 (Note: Written with a closed loop in traditional Chinese, simplified Chinese, and kyūjitai, as in 巳. Middle part is open in shinjitai, as in 己. (Chinese: 包, Japanese: 包)) 年 危 后 兵 我 束 卵 承 垂 刷 重 省 看 勉 七 乳 才 予 事 二 元 亡 六 主 市 交 忘 夜 育 京 卒 商 率 就 人 化 今 仁 付 代 仕 他 令 以 合 全 任 休 件 仲 作 何 位 住 余 (Note: 餘 also simplified to 余 in Japanese and Chinese, but to 馀 as a surname in Chinese.) 低 似 命 使 念 例 供 信 保 便 値 修 借 候 倍 俳 俵 健 停 働 像 先 入 八 分 公 共 弟 典 前 益 善 尊 同 周 次 兆 冷 弱 刀 切 判 制 券 刻 副 割 力 加 助 努 勇 勤 (Note: Top radical of the left component is 廿 (4 strokes) in traditional Chinese, simplified Chinese, and kyūjitai, as in 堇. It is 艹 (3 strokes) in shinjitai, as in 𦰌. (Chinese: 勤, Japanese: 勤)) 句 北 疑 十 古 孝 直 南 真 裁 博 上 反 灰 厚 原 台 能 友 収 口 司 右 兄 吸 告 君 味 呼 品 唱 器 (Note: Middle component is 犬 (4 strokes) in traditional Chinese, simplified Chinese, and kyūjitai. It is 大 (3 strokes) in shinjitai. (Chinese: 器, Japanese: 器)) 四 回 因 困 固 土 去 地 在 寺 均 志 坂 幸 型 城 基 域 喜 境 士 冬 各 夕 外 名 多 大 太 奏 女 好 始 妻 姉 妹 姿 子 存 安 字 守 宅 宇 完 定 官 宙 宗 室 客 宣 家 害 案 容 寄 密 宿 寒 富 察 寸 小 光 常 堂 尺 局 居 屋 展 山 岸 岩 炭 川 工 左 功 己 改 布 希 干 刊 幼 序 店 底 府 度 座 席 庭 康 延 建 式 弓 引 強 形 役 往 待 律 徒 得 街 心 快 性 忠 急 恩 情 感 想 成 戸 所 手 打 投 折 技 批 招 持 指 拾 接 推 探 授 提 操 支 政 故 教 救 散 敬 文 新 方 放 旅 族 旗 日 早 明 易 昔 春 星 昨 映 昭 最 量 景 晴 暗 暖 暴 曜 月 木 札 材 村 板 林 松 枚 枝 相 査 染 柱 格 校 根 株 梅 (Note: Right component has 2 dots in traditional Chinese, simplified Chinese, and kyūjitai, as in 每. It is a vertical line in shinjitai, as in 毎.) 械 植 棒 森 模 歌 止 整 死 列 段 母 毒 (Note: In traditional Chinese, the middle part of the bottom component sticks out and curves left, as in 毋. In simplified chinese, it is 2 dots, as in 母. In kyūjitai and shinjitai, it is a vertical line. (Traditional Chinese: 毒, Simplified Chinese: 毒, Japanese: 毒)) 比 毛 氏 水 池 汽 法 治 波 油 注 河 泣 沿 泳 洋 活 派 洗 海 流 消 酒 浴 深 混 清 液 港 湖 源 演 潮 激 火 然 照 熟 燃 受 父 片 版 牛 物 牧 特 犬 犯 王 玉 班 理 球 望 生 用 田 男 町 思 界 胃 留 略 病 痛 登 白 的 皇 泉 皮 皿 盛 盟 目 具 眼 矢 知 短 石 砂 破 磁 示 祭 禁 利 私 和 委 季 科 秋 秒 移 税 程 穴 究 空 立 童 竹 笑 第 笛 等 答 策 筋 算 管 箱 米 料 粉 精 糖 素 置 罪 羊 美 差 着 群 羽 翌 老 考 耕 耳 取 有 肉 服 肥 背 肺 胸 期 朝 腹 臣 自 息 至 舌 航 船 良 色 花 苦 若 英 芽 草 茶 荷 菜 落 幕 墓 蒸 暮 血 行 衣 初 西 要 票 角 解 言 警 谷 欲 豆 象 赤 走 起 足 路 身 射 返 近 述 送 追 退 逆 迷 通 速 造 道 郡 部 配 酸 番 里 野 防 限 院 降 除 陛 障 集 雨 雪 青 非 悲 面 革 音 章 意 食 首 骨 高

- Same simplification in both languages

(Order: Kyūjitai / traditional Chinese form - shinjitai / simplified Chinese form)
萬-万, 畫-画, 晝-昼, 蠶-蚕, 舊-旧, 臺-台, (Note: In China, 檯 and 颱 were also simplified to 台.) 爭-争, 來-来, 寫-写, 區-区, 醫-医, 點-点, 參-参, 號-号, 國-国, 聲-声, 條-条, 學-学, 寶-宝, 當-当, 黨-党, 屆-届, 屬-属, 徑-径 (Note: Right component is 𢀖 in simplified Chinese, but 圣 in shinjitai. (Simplifed Chinese: 径, Japanese: 径)), 擔-担, 數-数, 斷-断, 暑-暑, 橫-横, 殘-残 (Note: Right component has 2 horizontal lines in simplified Chinese, as in 戋. It has 3 lines in shinjitai, as in 㦮.), 淺-浅, 溫-温, 燈-灯, 狀-状, 將-将 (Note: Top right component is 夕 (3 strokes) in simplified Chinese, but 爫 (4 strokes) in shinjitai. (Simplified Chinese: 将, Japanese: 将)), 獨-独, 硏-研, 禮-礼, 社-社, 神-神, 祖-祖, 祝-祝, 福-福, 祕-秘, 署-署, 者-者, 朗-朗, 亂-乱, 辭-辞, 蟲-虫, 都-都, 靜-静, 麥-麦, 黃-黄, 會-会, 體-体, 裝-装, 雙-双

About 30% of the simplified Chinese characters match the Japanese shinjitai.

- Simplification in Japan only

(Order: Kyūjitai / traditional - shinjitai)

豫-予, (Note: Also remains an independent Traditional character.) 冰-氷, 罐-缶, 圍-囲, 巢-巣, 乘-乗, 佛-仏, 假-仮, 舍-舎, 效-効, 增-増, 卷-巻, 德-徳, 拜-拝, 藏-蔵, 黑-黒, 窗-窓 (Note: The shinjitai form is actually simplified from the variant 窻.), 缺-欠, 步-歩, 每-毎, 辨/瓣/辯-弁, (Note: In Japan, 弁 is used to simplify 3 different Traditional characters 辨, 瓣, and 辯.), 晚-晩, 稻-稲, 碎-砕, 醉-酔

- Simplification in PRC only (not exhaustive)

(Order: Kyūjitai / traditional Chinese form / modern Japanese form - simplified Chinese form)
業-业, 東-东, 島-岛, 別-别, 劇-剧, 願-愿, 裏-里, 係-系, 個-个, 倉-仓, 側-侧, 備-备, 傷-伤, 億-亿, 優-优, 並-并, 貧-贫, 興-兴, 軍-军, 創-创, 動-动, 勢-势, 協-协, 準-准, 幹-干, 員-员, 鳴-鸣, 園-园, 場-场, 報-报, 執-执, 奮-奋, 婦-妇, 孫-孙, 憲-宪, 導-导, 層-层 (Note: Bottom component has 2 dots in traditional Chinese and kyūjitai, as in 曾. It is a horizontal line in shinjitai, as in 曽. (Traditional Chinese: 層, Japanese: 層)), 岡-冈, 災-灾, 宮-宫, 順-顺, 師-师, 帳-帐, 庫-库, 張-张, 後-后, 術-术, 復-复, 衛/衞-卫, 態-态, 慣-惯, 採-采, 捨-舍, 揮-挥, 損-损, 漢-汉 (Note: Top radical of 𦰩 is 廿 (4 strokes) in traditional Chinese and kyūjitai, but 艹 (3 strokes) in shinjitai.), 敵-敌, 時-时, 題-题, 極-极, 構-构, 標-标, 機-机, 樹-树, 橋-桥, 決-决, 沖-冲, 減-减, 測-测, 湯-汤, 漁-渔, 潔-洁, 無-无, 熱-热, 愛-爱, 現-现, 節-节, 聖-圣 (Note: Top stroke of bottom component is slanted in traditional Chinese and kyūjitai, as in 𡈼 or 壬. It is straight in shinjitai, as in 王. (Traditional Chinese: 聖, Japanese: 聖)), 穀-谷, 異-异, 務-务, 確-确, 種-种, 積-积, 殺-杀 (Note: Bottom left component is 术 (4 strokes) in traditional Chinese and kyūjitai, but 木 (3 strokes) in shinjitai. (Traditional Chinese: 殺, Japanese: 殺)), 競-竞, 筆-笔, 築-筑, 簡-简, 約-约, 級-级, 紅-红, 紀-纪, 紙-纸, 納-纳, 純-纯, 組-组, 終-终, 細-细, 結-结, 給-给, 統-统, 絹-绢, 綿-绵, 線/綫-缐/线, 網-网, 緯-纬, 編-编, 縮-缩, 績-绩, 織-织, 買-买, 義-义, 養-养, 習-习, 職-职, 書-书, 脈-脉, 勝-胜, 腸-肠, 臨-临, 葉-叶, 夢-梦, 眾/衆-众 (Note: 眾 is used in traditional Chinese, 衆 is used in kyūjitai and shinjitai.), 補-补, 製-制, 複-复, 見-见, 規-规, 親-亲, 計-计, 記-记, 討-讨, 訓-训, 設-设, 許-许, 訪-访, 評-评, 詞-词, 話-话, 試-试, 詩-诗, 誠-诚, 語-语, 認-认, 誤-误 (Note: Right component is like 大 at the bottom in traditional Chinese and kyūjitai, as in 吳. It is 2 dots at the bottom in shinjitai, as in 呉. (Traditional Chinese: 誤, Japanese: 誤)), 誌-志, 調-调, 論-论, 談-谈, 課-课, 誕-诞, 講-讲, 謝-谢, 識-识, 議-议, 護-护, 頭-头, 貝-贝, 負-负, 則-则, 財-财, 敗-败, 責-责, 貨-货, 費-费, 貸-贷, 視-视, 貴-贵, 貯-贮, 賀-贺, 貿-贸, 資-资, 賃-赁, 質-质, 車-车, 輪-轮, 輸-输, 農-农, 連-连, 進-进, 週-周, 過-过, 運-运, 達-达, 遊-游, 遠-远, 適-适, 選-选, 遺-遗, 郵-邮, 針-针, 銀-银, 銅-铜, 鋼-钢, 鏡-镜, 長-长, 門-门, 問-问, 閉-闭, 間-间, 開-开, 聞-闻, 閣-阁, 陸-陆, 隊-队, 階-阶, 陽-阳, 際-际, 難-难, 雲-云, 電-电, 頂-顶, 類-类 (Note: Bottom left component is 犬 (4 strokes) in traditional Chinese and kyūjitai, but 大 (3 strokes) in shinjitai. (Traditional Chinese: 類, Japanese: 類)), 預-预, 領-领, 額-额, 風-风, 飛-飞, 飲-饮, 飯-饭, 飼-饲, 館-馆, 馬-马, 魚-鱼, 鳥-鸟, 蕓-芸, 滬-沪, 橢-椭

- Different simplifications in both languages

(Order: Kyūjitai / traditional Chinese - simplified Chinese - shinjitai)
兩-两-両, 惡-恶-悪, 單-单-単, 嚴-严-厳, 傳-传-伝, 價-价-価, 兒-儿-児, 變-变-変, 圓-圆-円, 勞-劳-労, 壓-压-圧, 營-营-営, 團-团-団, 圖-图-図, 圍-围-囲, 賣-卖-売, 鹽-盐-塩, 處-处-処, 據-据-拠, 實-实-実, 專-专-専, 縣-县-県, 廣-广-広, 應-应-応, 歸-归-帰, 戰-战-戦, 擴-扩-拡, 擧-举-挙, 從-从-従, 戲-戏-戯, 對-对-対, 榮-荣-栄, 櫻-樱-桜, 檢-检-検, 樂-乐-楽, 樣-样-様, 權-权-権, 產-产-産, 氣-气-気, 濟-济-済, 齋-斋-斎, 滿-满-満, 帶-带-帯, 殼-壳-殻, 歷-历-歴, 曆-历-暦, 莊-庄-荘, 歲-岁-歳, 肅-肃-粛, 龍-龙-竜, 龜-龟-亀, 靈-灵-霊, 麵-面-麺, 燒-烧-焼, 發-发-発, 顯-显-顕, 絲-丝-糸, 經-经-経, 髮-发-髪, 繪-绘-絵, 續-续-続, 總-总-総, 練-练-練, 綠-绿-緑, 緣-缘-縁, 繩-绳-縄, 壞-坏-壊, 絕-绝-絶, 繼-继-継, 縱-纵-縦, 纖-纤-繊, 腦-脑-脳, 臟-脏-臓, 著-着-著 (Note: Kyūjitai has a dot above 日, traditional Chinese does not.), 藥-药-薬, 覺-觉-覚, 覽-览-覧, 頰-颊-頬, 觀-观-観, 譯-译-訳, 證-证-証, 讀-读-読, 說-说-説, 讓-让-譲, 豐-丰-豊, 贊-赞-賛, 轉-转-転, 輕-轻-軽, 邊-边-辺, 遞-递-逓, 遲-迟-遅, 鄕-乡-郷, 鐵-铁-鉄, 鑛/礦-矿-鉱, 錢-钱-銭, 鑒-鉴-鑑, 銳-锐-鋭, 錄-录-録, 藝-艺-芸, 鑄-铸-鋳, 鍊-炼-錬, 關-关-関, 險-险-険, 隱-隐-隠, 雜-杂-雑, 顏-颜-顔, 驛-驿-駅, 驅-驱-駆, 驗-验-験, 齒-齿-歯, 聽-听-聴, 廳-厅-庁, 擊-击-撃, 辯-辩-弁,濱-滨-浜, 澀-涩-渋, (Note: The shinjitai form is actually simplified from the variant 澁.) 濾-滤-沪

== Traditional characters that may cause problems displaying ==
Some of the traditional kanji are not included in the Japanese font of Windows XP/2000, and only rectangles are shown. Downloading the Meiryo font from the Microsoft website (VistaFont_JPN.EXE) and installing it will solve this problem.

Note that within the Jōyō Kanji there are 62 characters the old forms of which may cause problems displaying:

Kyōiku Kanji (26):

- Grade 2 (2 Kanji): 海 社
- Grade 3 (8 Kanji): 勉 暑 漢 神 福 練 者 都
- Grade 4 (6 Kanji): 器 殺 祝 節 梅 類
- Grade 5 (1 Kanji): 祖
- Grade 6 (9 Kanji): 勤 穀 視 署 層 著 諸 難 朗

Secondary-School Kanji (36):

- 欄 廊 虜 隆 塚 祥 侮 僧 免 卑 喝 嘆 塀 墨 悔 慨 憎 懲 敏 既 煮 碑 祉 祈 禍 突 繁 臭 褐 謁 謹 賓 贈 逸 響 頻

These characters are Unicode CJK Unified Ideographs for which the old form (kyūjitai) and the new form (shinjitai) have been unified under the Unicode standard. Although the old and new forms are distinguished under the JIS X 0213 standard, the old forms map to Unicode CJK Compatibility Ideographs which are considered by Unicode to be canonically equivalent to the new forms and may not be distinguished by user agents. Therefore, depending on the user environment, it may not be possible to see the distinction between old and new forms of the characters. In particular, all Unicode normalization methods merge the old characters with the new ones.

== Different stroke orders in Chinese and Japanese ==
Different stroke orders of the character 必, from black to red.
Traditional	ROC, Hong Kong & Macau	Japan	Mainland China

Some characters, whether simplified or not, look the same in Chinese and Japanese, but have different stroke orders. For example, in Japan, 必 is written with the top dot first, while the traditional stroke order writes the 丿 first. In the characters 王 and 玉, the vertical stroke is the third stroke in Chinese, but the second stroke in Japanese. Taiwan, Hong Kong and Macau use traditional characters, though with an altered stroke order.

== See also ==
- Singapore Chinese characters
