= List of Commonly Used Characters in Modern Chinese =

Standard list of Chinese characters

The List of Commonly Used Characters in Modern Chinese (simplified Chinese: 现代汉语通用字表; traditional Chinese: 現代漢語通用字表; pinyin: Xiàndài Hànyǔ Tōngyòngzì Biǎo) is a list of 7,000 commonly used Chinese characters in Chinese. It was created in 1988 in the People's Republic of China.

In 2013, the List of Commonly Used Standard Chinese Characters has replaced the List of Commonly Used Characters in Modern Chinese as the standard for Chinese characters in the People's Republic of China.
