= Chinese Character Simplification Scheme =

1956 publication of simplified Chinese characters

- Original title: 漢字簡化方案
- Presented: 7 January 1955
- Ratified: 31 January 1956
- Date effective: 1 February 1956
- Superseded: May 1964, by the General List of Simplified Chinese Characters
- Commissioned by: State Council of the People's Republic of China
- Author(s): Language Reform Research Committee of China
- Purpose: Chinese character simplification

Full text
- zh:漢字簡化方案 at Wikisource

Chinese name
- Traditional Chinese: 漢字簡化方案
- Simplified Chinese: 汉字简化方案
Transcriptions
Standard Mandarin
- Hanyu Pinyin: Hànzì jiǎnhuà fāng'àn

The Chinese Character Simplification Scheme is a list of simplified Chinese characters promulgated in 1956 by the State Council of the People's Republic of China. It contains the vast majority of simplified characters in use today. To distinguish it from the second round of simplified Chinese characters published in 1977, the 1956 list is also known as the First Chinese Character Simplification Scheme.

== History ==
In 1952, the Language Reform Research Committee of China first drafted the List of Frequently Used Simplification of Chinese Characters (常用漢字簡化表草案), affirming the principle of "only describing and stating the concepts of the ancient [Han] people, not creating [new characters]".

The Chinese Character Simplification Scheme (Draft) was published on 7 January 1955 for public consultation. It consists of three sections: List of simplification of 798 characters (draft) (798個漢字簡化表草案), List of 400 Variant Characters Intended to Be Abolished (Draft) (擬廢除的400個異體字表草案) and List of Simplification in Handwriting of Character Components (Draft) (漢字偏旁手寫簡化表草案). The second and third sections were deleted in the modification process. The modified Chinese Character Simplification Scheme (Draft) was passed by the National Language Reform Meeting after discussion in October 1955, followed by modifications by the Language Reform Committee of China in accordance to the outcome of the discussions. The modified draft was reviewed by the State Council's Committee for the Application of the Chinese Character Simplification Scheme.

On 21 November 1955, the Ministry of Education issued a Notice Regarding the Implementation of Simplified Chinese Character in All Schools (關於在各級學校推行簡化漢字的通知). The People's Liberation Army General Political Department made similar notices in the same month.

On 28 January 1956, the 23rd State Council Plenary Meeting passed the Resolution Regarding the Promulgation of the "Chinese Character Simplification Scheme" (關於公布〈漢字簡化方案〉的決議). On 31 January 1956, People's Daily published in full about the Resolution Regarding the Promulgation of the "Chinese Character Simplification Scheme" and the Chinese Character Simplification Scheme (漢字簡化方案). The first list of the scheme was used nationwide on 1 February 1956, and the rest was put into use in batches later.

== Structure ==
The Chinese Character Simplification Scheme is divided into three parts. The first part consists of 230 simplified characters; the second part consists of 285 simplified characters; the third part consists of 54 simplified components. The first and second parts differ in their time of implementation; the first part was to be implemented the day after the announcement, while the second part was mostly implemented in three batches later between 1956 and 1959 after further trials and slight changes, leaving out 28 simplified characters which were implemented in 1964 when the List of Simplified Chinese Characters was published.

== Later development ==
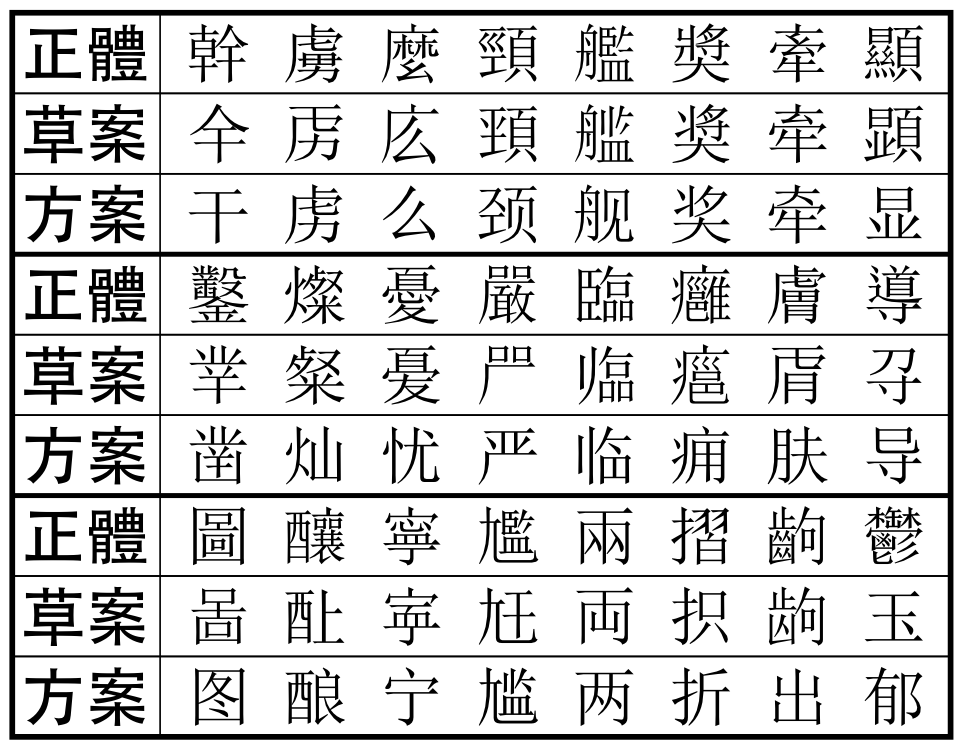
Comparison between the 1955 simplification scheme draft (middle rows each third) and the final simplified character set released in 1956 (bottom rows), alongside traditional character equivalents for reference (top rows).

The simplification of Chinese characters met strong resistance from sections of academia and the public. The prominent scholar Chen Mengjia was one of the outspoken critics of the scheme. When the Anti-Rightist Movement began in 1957, Chen was labeled a rightist and attacked as an enemy of the party. In 1966, at the beginning of the Cultural Revolution, Chen was again severely persecuted for his ideas and committed suicide.

On 10 January 1958, Premier Zhou Enlai gave a report on the task of Chinese writing reform, in which he criticized "rightists" for opposing the scheme, saying that the opposition was used to undermine the party and state. He went on to state that simplification was "in line with the interests of the general public," and "should be strongly supported."

Significant changes were subsequently made to the list, in particular the introduction of the principle of simplification by analogy. In May 1964, the Language Reform Committee published the General List of Simplified Chinese Characters to address the defects found in the Chinese Character Simplification Scheme.

It is divided into three parts. The first part records 352 simplified characters that are not used as radicals; The second part records simplified characters that may be used as radicals and 14 simplified radicals; The third part records 1754 simplified characters that are formed according to its radicals. There are a total of 2238 characters listed. In actuality, only 2236 characters were simplified, as 签 qiān and 须 xū appear twice.

The Language Reform Committee of China proposed the draft Second Chinese Character Simplification Scheme on 20 December 1977; it was rescinded in 1986.
