= List of Commonly Used Standard Chinese Characters =

2013 Chinese character standard

- Simplified Chinese: 通用规范汉字表
- Traditional Chinese: 通用規範漢字表
- Literal meaning: General Use Standardized Chinese Character Table
Transcriptions
Standard Mandarin
- Hanyu Pinyin: Tōngyòng guīfàn Hànzì biǎo

The List of Commonly Used Standard Chinese Characters is the current standard list of 8,105 Chinese characters published by the government of the People's Republic of China and promulgated in June 2013.

The project began in 2001, originally named the "Table of Standard Chinese Characters". This table integrates the First Batch of Simplified Characters (1955), the Complete List of Simplified Characters (initially published in 1964, last revised in 1986), and the List of Commonly Used Characters in Modern Chinese (1988), while also refining and improving it based on the current usage of characters in mainland China. After 8 years of development, a draft for public comment was released on August 12, 2009. It was officially promulgated on June 5, 2013, becoming the standard for the use of Chinese characters in general societal applications, and all previously related character lists were discontinued from that date.

Of the characters included, 3,500 are in Tier 1 and designated as frequently used characters; Tier 2 includes 3,000 characters that are designated as commonly used characters but less frequently used than those in Tier 1; Tier 3 includes 1,605 characters that are commonly used as names and terminology. The list also offers a table of correspondences between 2,546 Simplified Chinese characters and 2,574 Traditional Chinese characters, along with other selected variant forms. This table replaced all previous related standards, and provides the authoritative list of characters and glyph shapes for Simplified Chinese in China. The Table eliminates 500 characters that were in the previous version. This project was led by Professor Wan Ning from the Beijing Normal University's School of Chinese Language and Literature. Contributing to the project were Professor Wang Lijun, Associate Professor Bu Shixia, and Professor Ling Lijun, also from the School of Chinese Language and Literature. The Table underwent over 90 revisions over a span of 10 years before its release.

== Non-BMP characters ==
In Unicode, some characters in the List of Commonly Used Standard Chinese Characters are located outside of the Basic Multilingual Plane (BMP).

196 non-BMP characters in the List of Commonly Used Standard Chinese Characters
No.	Char.	Unicode	Pinyin
4004	𬉼	U+2C27C	ǒu
4190	𠳐	U+20CD0	bāng
5989	𥻗	U+25ED7	chá
6506	𠙶	U+20676	ǒu
6520	𬣙	U+2C8D9	xū
6529	𨙸	U+28678	qí
6547	𬇕	U+2C1D5	wàn
6551	𬣞	U+2C8DE	zhǔ
6553	𬘓	U+2C613	xún
6560	𫭟	U+2BB5F	ōu, qū
6564	𫭢	U+2BB62	lǔn
6576	𫇭	U+2B1ED	wěi
6586	𫐄	U+2B404	yuè
6594	𫵷	U+2BD77	lì
6612	𣲘	U+23C98	wǔ
6613	𣲗	U+23C97	wéi
6616	𬇙	U+2C1D9	bèi
6623	𬣡	U+2C8E1	jiàn
6630	𫸩	U+2BE29	kōu
6637	𨚕	U+28695	biàn
6640	𫘜	U+2B61C	wén
6642	𬘘	U+2C618	dǎn
6643	𫘝	U+2B61D	jué
6658	𦭜	U+26B5C	zhī
6670	𬨂	U+2CA02	qí
6671	𬀩	U+2C029	wěi
6672	𬀪	U+2C02A	xiàn
6688	𬬩	U+2CB29	yì
6730	𫍣	U+2B363	tóng
6731	𬣳	U+2C8F3	hěn
6732	𬩽	U+2CA7D	xún
6737	𬮿	U+2CBBF	gài
6739	𬯀	U+2CBC0	jī
6744	𫰛	U+2BC1B	xíng
6747	𬳵	U+2CCF5	pī
6749	𬳶	U+2CCF6	jiōng
6752	𫠊	U+2B80A	xuán
6761	𬍛	U+2C35B	lì
6791	𬜬	U+2C72C	màn
6794	𦰡	U+26C21	nà, nuó
6820	𪾢	U+2AFA2	xiàn
6839	𪨰	U+2AA30	qū
6844	𫓧	U+2B4E7	fū
6846	𬬮	U+2CB2E	chǎng
6847	𬬱	U+2CB31	jīn
6848	𬬭	U+2CB2D	lún
6867	𦙶	U+26676	gǔ
6919	𬘡	U+2C621	yīn
6920	𬳽	U+2CCFD	shēn
6921	𬘩	U+2C629	tīng
6922	𫄧	U+2B127	yán
6932	𪟝	U+2A7DD	jì
6937	𬍤	U+2C364	xún
6941	𫭼	U+2BB7C	láo
6951	𬜯	U+2C72F	liǎng
6959	𬂩	U+2C0A9	jiā
6967	𫠆	U+2B806	kuǐ
6976	𨐈	U+28408	guāng
6979	𬌗	U+2C317	hé
6995	𫑡	U+2B461	méng
6999	𪨶	U+2AA36	shē
7004	𬬸	U+2CB38	shù
7006	𬬻	U+2CB3B	lú
7007	𬬹	U+2CB39	shén
7008	𬬿	U+2CB3F	zhāo
7009	𬭁	U+2CB41	mǔ
7019	𫢸	U+2B8B8	dàn
7039	𫗧	U+2B5E7	sù
7053	𬊈	U+2C288	xún
7070	𬒈	U+2C488	què
7084	𨺙	U+28E99	nì
7093	𬳿	U+2CCFF	tú
7094	𫄨	U+2B128	chī
7097	𬘫	U+2C62B	huán
7114	𫮃	U+2BB83	shàn
7161	𬱖	U+2CC56	dí
7166	𬟽	U+2C7FD	dōng
7177	𫓯	U+2B4EF	jī
7178	𫟹	U+2B7F9	hóng
7180	𫟼	U+2B7FC	dá
7219	𠅤	U+20164	xí
7234	𬇹	U+2C1F9	guó
7241	𬍡	U+2C361	dàng
7249	𬤇	U+2C907	yīn
7250	𫍯	U+2B36F	xián
7254	𬤊	U+2C90A	shì
7255	𫍲	U+2B372	xiǎo
7260	𬯎	U+2CBCE	tuí
7273	𬘬	U+2C62C	qiàn
7274	𬘭	U+2C62D	chēn
7275	𬴂	U+2CD02	fēi
7276	𫘦	U+2B626	táo
7278	𫟅	U+2B7C5	liáng
7279	𬘯	U+2C62F	zhǔn
7281	𫘧	U+2B627	lù
7299	𪣻	U+2A8FB	lóu
7300	𡎚	U+2139A	piǎn
7326	𬃊	U+2C0CA	zhì
7334	𬷕	U+2CDD5	bǔ
7343	𫐐	U+2B410	ní
7347	𬹼	U+2CE7C	xiè
7354	𧿹	U+27FF9	mǔ
7361	𫶇	U+2BD87	dié
7367	𫖮	U+2B5AE	yǐ
7375	𬭊	U+2CB4A	dù
7377	𨱇	U+28C47	qiú
7378	𫓶	U+2B4F6	xuān
7382	𬭎	U+2CB4E	hóng
7399	𫖯	U+2B5AF	fǔ
7405	𬱟	U+2CC5F	wěi
7408	𫛭	U+2B6ED	kuáng
7414	𫷷	U+2BDF7	xīn
7421	𬮱	U+2CBB1	yīn
7423	𬊤	U+2C2A4	chǎn
7425	𣸣	U+23E23	fén
7456	𬴃	U+2CD03	huō
7457	𫘨	U+2B628	tí
7470	𤧛	U+249DB	dì
7503	𬪩	U+2CAA9	nóng
7506	𬒔	U+2C494	gěng
7512	𬨎	U+2CA0E	yóu
7513	𫐓	U+2B413	róu
7519	𫫇	U+2BAC7	è
7529	𫓹	U+2B4F9	jī
7534	𬭚	U+2CB5A	chún
7537	𬭛	U+2CB5B	bō
7541	𬕂	U+2C542	lǒng
7561	𬶋	U+2CD8B	jū
7562	𬶍	U+2CD8D	tuó
7568	𦝼	U+2677C	lóu, lǘ
7580	𫔶	U+2B536	niè
7602	𫌀	U+2B300	jī
7610	𫖳	U+2B5B3	yūn
7617	𫘪	U+2B62A	yuán
7618	𫘬	U+2B62C	xí
7622	𫞩	U+2B7A9	mén
7635	𡐓	U+21413	kāng
7638	𪤗	U+2A917	liào
7650	𣗋	U+235CB	dǎng
7654	𬸘	U+2CE18	yǎn
7661	𬒗	U+2C497	lán
7663	𥔲	U+25532	è
7667	𫚖	U+2B696	cǐ
7678	𨱏	U+28C4F	dā
7682	𬭤	U+2CB64	hóu
7701	𫚕	U+2B695	shī
7706	𬶐	U+2CD90	zhào
7707	𬶏	U+2CD8F	wéi
7708	𩽾	U+29F7E	ān
7712	𬸚	U+2CE1A	yuè
7737	𬤝	U+2C91D	huì
7746	𬙂	U+2C642	yǎn
7789	𬭩	U+2CB69	wēng
7799	𩾃	U+29F83	miǎn
7824	𬸣	U+2CE23	xiān
7828	𫍽	U+2B37D	xuān
7831	𬴊	U+2CD0A	lín
7841	𬞟	U+2C79F	pín
7851	𥕢	U+25562	cáo
7854	𫟦	U+2B7E6	suì
7855	𬺈	U+2CE88	yǐ
7856	𫠜	U+2B81C	ní
7870	𪩘	U+2AA58	yǎn
7872	𬭬	U+2CB6C	huì
7873	𨱑	U+28C51	huáng
7874	𬭯	U+2CB6F	piě
7890	𫗴	U+2B5F4	zhān
7894	𬸦	U+2CE26	zhuó
7916	𫄷	U+2B137	yì
7918	𤩽	U+24A7D	huán
7937	𬭳	U+2CB73	xǐ
7939	𬭶	U+2CB76	hēi
7940	𫔍	U+2B50D	fán
7943	𬭸	U+2CB78	lín
7944	𨱔	U+28C54	zūn
7945	𬭼	U+2CB7C	suì
7946	𫔎	U+2B50E	jué
7958	𬸪	U+2CE2A	fán
7961	𬶟	U+2CD9F	là
7963	𬶠	U+2CDA0	liàn
7974	𬶨	U+2CDA8	jì
7979	𦈡	U+26221	xū
7980	𫄸	U+2B138	xūn
7987	𬟁	U+2C7C1	yì
7996	𥖨	U+255A8	zào
8020	𦒍	U+2648D	tóng
8030	𬙊	U+2C64A	mò
8042	𬶭	U+2CDAD	jì
8043	𩾌	U+29F8C	kāng
8057	𨟠	U+287E0	quān
8062	𬶮	U+2CDAE	xǐ
8063	𨭉	U+28B49	bān
8073	𬙋	U+2C64B	xiāng
8075	𤫉	U+24AC9	xiè
8079	𬺓	U+2CE93	chǔ
8100	𫚭	U+2B6AD	liè

== See also ==
- The List of Commonly Used Standard Chinese Characters with Mandarin readings
- Pinyin reading index for the List of Commonly Used Standard Chinese Characters
- Table of Comparison between Standard, Traditional and Variant Chinese Characters
- The First Series of Standardized Forms of Words with Non-standardized Variant Forms
- Chart of Standard Forms of Common National Characters, a standardized list of Chinese characters published by the Republic of China Ministry of Education
- Jōyō kanji, a standardized list of Chinese characters used in Japanese (kanji) published by the Japanese Ministry of Education
- Basic Hanja for educational use, a standardized list of Chinese characters used in Korean (Hanja) published by the South Korean Ministry of Education
