= Simplified Chinese characters =

Standardized set of Chinese characters

Simplified Chinese
- Script type: Logographic
- Published: 1956; 1964; 1977; 1988; 2013
- Period: 1956–present
- Direction: Left-to-right; Top-to-bottom, columns right-to-left
- Official script: China; Singapore
- Languages: Chinese

Related scripts
- Parent systems: Oracle bone script: Small seal script; Clerical script; Regular script; Simplified Chinese
- Sister systems: Traditional characters; Kanji; Chữ Nôm; Hanja; Khitan large script; Khitan small script; Bopomofo

ISO 15924
- ISO 15924: Hans (501), Han (Simplified variant)

Unicode
- Unicode range: Not in Unicode

Chinese name
- Simplified Chinese: 简化字
- Traditional Chinese: 簡化字
Transcriptions
Standard Mandarin
- Hanyu Pinyin: Jiǎnhuàzì
- Bopomofo: ㄐㄧㄢˇ ㄏㄨㄚˋ ㄗˋ
- Wade–Giles: Chien^{3}-hua^{4}-tzŭ^{4}
- Tongyong Pinyin: Jiǎn-huà-zìh
- IPA: [tɕjɛ̀n.xwâ.tsɹ̩̂]
Yue: Cantonese
- Yale Romanization: Gáan faa jih
- Jyutping: Gaan2 faa3 zi6
- IPA: [kan˧˥ fa˧ tsi˨]

Alternative Chinese name
- Simplified Chinese: 简体字
- Traditional Chinese: 簡體字
Transcriptions
Standard Mandarin
- Hanyu Pinyin: Jiǎntǐzì
- Bopomofo: ㄐㄧㄢˇ ㄊㄧˇ ㄗˋ
- Wade–Giles: Chien^{3}-tʻi^{3}-tzŭ^{4}
- Tongyong Pinyin: Jiǎn-tǐ-zìh
- IPA: [tɕjɛ̀n.tʰì.tsɹ̩̂]
Yue: Cantonese
- Yale Romanization: Gáan tái jih
- Jyutping: Gaan2 tai2 zi6
- IPA: [kan˧˥ tʰɐj˧˥ tsi˨]

Simplified Chinese characters are one of two standardized character sets used to write the Chinese language, with the other being traditional characters. Their widespread adoption during the 20th century was part of efforts by the People’s Republic of China (PRC) to promote literacy. Today, they are the standard forms used in mainland China, Malaysia, and Singapore, while traditional characters are officially used in Hong Kong, Macau, and Taiwan.

Simplification of Chinese script typically involves reducing a character's total stroke count or streamlining which strokes appear in a given component. By systematically simplifying radicals, large swaths of the character set are altered at once. Many simplifications were drawn from popular cursive forms, while variant characters with identical pronunciation and meaning were consolidated into a single standardized form, usually the simplest available. Many characters were left untouched and are thus identical in both orthographies.

The PRC government has never officially declared the simplification process complete. A second round of simplified characters, promulgated in 1977 in the wake of the Cultural Revolution, was largely composed of artificial new variants designed to reduce stroke counts rather than drawing on existing cursive forms. It proved unpopular and confusing before being retracted in 1986. In 2013, China's State Council implemented the List of Commonly Used Standard Chinese Characters, listing 8,105 characters including a small number of revised forms.

== Nomenclature ==
In Chinese, simplified characters are referred to by their official name 简化字; jiǎnhuàzì, or colloquially as 简体字; jiǎntǐzì. The latter term refers broadly to all character variants featuring simplifications of character form or structure, (Note: The Xiandai Hanyu Guifan Cidian defines the term as "Chinese characters that have undergone simplification" (经过简化的汉字).) a practice which has always been present as a part of the Chinese writing system. The official name tends to refer to the specific, systematic set published by the Chinese government, which includes not only simplifications of individual characters, but also a substantial reduction in the total number of characters through the merger of formerly distinct forms.

== History ==
=== Background ===
According to Chinese palaeographer Qiu Xigui, the broadest trend in the evolution of Chinese characters over their history has been simplification, both in graphical shape (字形; zìxíng), the "external appearances of individual graphs", and in graphical form (字体; 字體; zìtǐ), "overall changes in the distinguishing features of graphic[al] shape and calligraphic style, [...] in most cases refer[ring] to rather obvious and rather substantial changes". The initiatives following the founding of the Qin dynasty (221–206 BC) to universalize the use of their small seal script across the recently conquered parts of the empire is generally seen as being the first real attempt at script reform in Chinese history.

Before the 20th century, variation in character shape on the part of scribes, which would continue with the later invention of woodblock printing, was ubiquitous. For example, prior to the Qin dynasty (221–206 BC) the character meaning 'bright' was written as either 明 or 朙—with either 日 'Sun' or 囧 'window' on the left, with the 月 'Moon' component on the right. Li Si (d. 208 BC), the Chancellor of Qin, attempted to universalize the Qin small seal script across China following the wars that had politically unified the country for the first time. Li prescribed the 朙 form of the character for 'bright', but some scribes ignored this and continued to write the character as 明. However, the increased usage of 朙 was followed by proliferation of a third variant: 眀, with 目 'eye' on the left—likely derived as a contraction of 朙. Ultimately, 明 became the character's standard form.

The Book of Han (111 AD) describes an earlier attempt made by King Xuan of Zhou (d. 782 BC) to unify character forms across the states of ancient China, with his chief chronicler having "[written] fifteen chapters describing" what is referred to as the "big seal script". The traditional narrative, as also attested in the Shuowen Jiezi dictionary (c. 100 AD), is that the Qin small seal script that would later be imposed across China was originally derived from the Zhou big seal script with few modifications. However, the body of epigraphic evidence comparing the character forms used by scribes gives no indication of any real consolidation in character forms prior to the founding of the Qin. The Han dynasty (202 BC – 220 AD) that inherited the Qin administration coincided with the perfection of clerical script through the process of libian.

=== Late Qing literature and Republican-era reform (1850–1949) ===
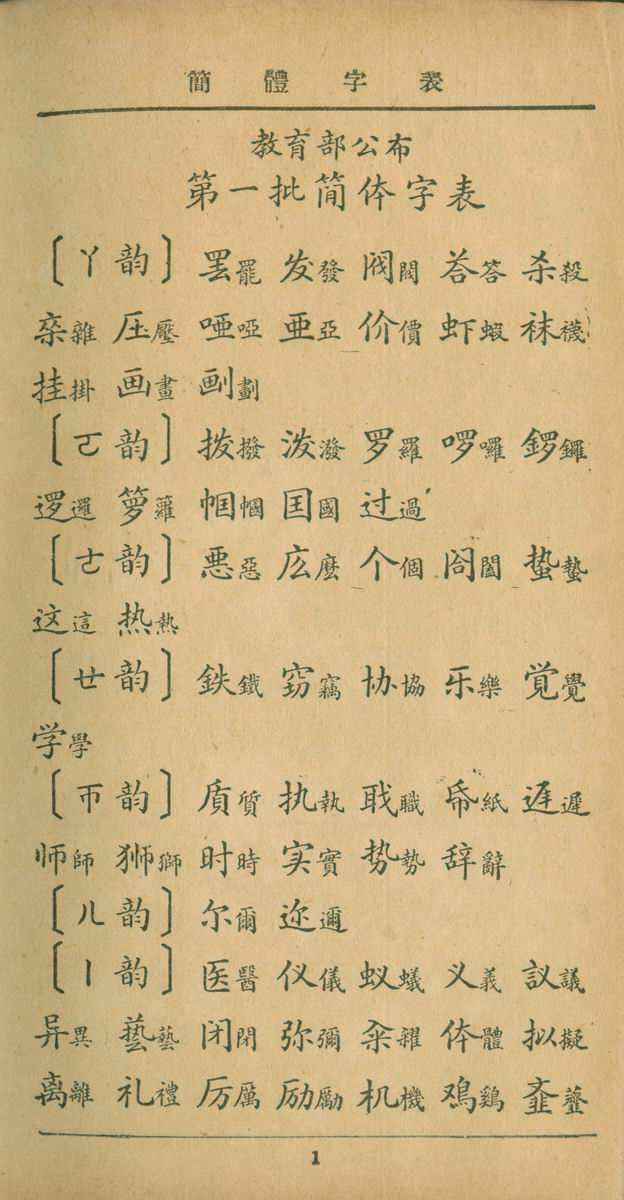
Excerpt of initial 1935 simplifications promulgated by the Republic of China Ministry of Education in 1935, later retracted in 1936

Though most closely associated with the People's Republic, the idea of a mass simplification of character forms first gained traction in China during the early 20th century. In 1909, the educator and linguist Lufei Kui formally proposed the use of simplified characters in education for the first time. Over the following years—marked by the 1911 Xinhai Revolution that toppled the Qing dynasty, followed by growing social and political discontent that further erupted into the 1919 May Fourth Movement—many anti-imperialist intellectuals throughout China began to see the country's writing system as a serious impediment to its modernization. In 1916, a multi-part English-language article entitled "The Problem of the Chinese Language" co-authored by the Chinese linguist Yuen Ren Chao (1892–1982) and poet Hu Shih (1891–1962) has been identified as a turning point in the history of the Chinese script—as it was one of the first clear calls for China to move away from the use of characters entirely. Instead, Chao proposed that the language be written with an alphabet, which he saw as more logical and efficient. The alphabetization and simplification campaigns would exist alongside one another among the Republican intelligentsia for the next several decades.

Recent commentators have echoed some contemporary claims that Chinese characters were blamed for the economic problems in China during that time. Lu Xun, one of the most prominent Chinese authors of the 20th century, stated that "if Chinese characters are not destroyed, then China will die" (漢字不滅，中國必亡). During the 1930s and 1940s, discussions regarding simplification took place within the ruling Kuomintang (KMT) party. Many members of the Chinese intelligentsia maintained that simplification would increase literacy rates throughout the country. In 1935, the Republic of China Ministry of Education published the first official list of simplified forms, consisting of 324 characters collated by Peking University professor Qian Xuantong. However, fierce opposition within the KMT resulted in the list being rescinded in 1936.

=== First round of simplification (1949–1977) ===
Work throughout the 1950s resulted in the 1956 promulgation of the Chinese Character Simplification Scheme, a draft of 515 simplified characters and 54 simplified components, whose simplifications would be present in most compound characters. Over the following decade, the Script Reform Committee deliberated on characters in the 1956 scheme, collecting public input regarding the recognizability of variants, and often approving forms in small batches. Parallel to simplification, there were also initiatives aimed at eliminating the use of characters entirely and replacing them with pinyin as an official Chinese alphabet, but this possibility was abandoned, confirmed by a speech given by Zhou Enlai in 1958. In 1965, the PRC published the (hereafter Characters for Printing), which included standard printed forms for 6196 characters, including all of the forms from the 1956 scheme.

=== Second round of simplification (1977–1986) ===
A second round of simplified characters was promulgated in 1977, but was poorly received by the public and quickly fell out of official use. It was ultimately formally rescinded in 1986. The second-round simplifications were unpopular in large part because most of the forms were completely new, in contrast to the familiar variants comprising the majority of the first round. With the rescission of the second round, work toward further character simplification largely came to an end.

=== Since 1986 ===
In 1986, authorities retracted the second round completely, though they had been largely fallen out of use within a year of their initial introduction. That year, the authorities also promulgated a final version of the General List of Simplified Chinese Characters. It was identical to the 1964 list save for 6 changes—including the restoration of 3 characters that had been simplified in the first round: 叠, 覆, 像; the form 疊 is used instead of 叠 in regions using traditional characters. The Chinese government stated that it wished to keep Chinese orthography stable.

The Chart of Generally Utilized Characters of Modern Chinese was published in 1988 and included 7000 simplified and unsimplified characters. Of these, half were also included in the revised List of Commonly Used Characters in Modern Chinese, which specified 2500 common characters and 1000 less common characters. In 2009, the Chinese government published a major revision to the list which included a total of 8300 characters. No new simplifications were introduced. In addition, slight modifications to the orthography of 44 characters to fit traditional calligraphic rules were initially proposed, but were not implemented due to negative public response. Also, the practice of unrestricted simplification of rare and archaic characters by analogy using simplified radicals or components is now discouraged. A State Language Commission official cited "oversimplification" as the reason for restoring some characters. The language authority declared an open comment period until 31 August 2009, for feedback from the public.

In 2013, the List of Commonly Used Standard Chinese Characters was published as a revision of the 1988 lists; it included a total of 8105 characters. It included 45 newly recognized standard characters that were previously considered variant forms, as well as official approval of 226 characters that had been simplified by analogy and had seen wide use but were not explicitly given in previous lists or documents.

=== Outside mainland China ===
Singapore underwent three successive rounds of character simplification, eventually arriving at the same set of simplified characters as mainland China. The first round was promulgated by the Ministry of Education in 1969, consisting of 498 simplified characters derived from 502 traditional characters. A second round of 2287 simplified characters was promulgated in 1974. The second set contained 49 differences from the mainland China system; these were removed in the final round in 1976. In 1993, Singapore adopted the 1986 mainland China revisions. Unlike in mainland China, Singapore parents have the option of registering their children's names in traditional characters.

Malaysia also promulgated a set of simplified characters in 1981, though completely identical to the mainland Chinese set. They are used in Chinese-language schools.

== Methodology ==
=== Structural simplification ===
All characters simplified this way are enumerated in Charts 1 and 2 of the 1986 General List of Simplified Chinese Characters, hereafter the General List.

- Chart 1 lists all 350 characters that are used by themselves, and can never serve as 'simplified character components'.
- Chart 2 lists 132 characters that are used by themselves as well as utilized as simplified character components to further derive other simplified characters. Chart 2 also lists 14 components or radicals that cannot be used by themselves, but can be generalized for derivation of more complex characters.

=== Derivation based on simplified components ===
- Chart 3 of the General List includes 1753 characters which are simplified based on the same simplification principles used for components and radicals in Chart 2. This list is non-exhaustive, so if a character is not already found in Charts 1–3, but can be simplified in accordance with Chart 2, the character should be simplified.

=== Elimination of variants ===
- Series One Organization List of Variant Characters accounts for some of the orthography differences in mainland China versus in Hong Kong and Taiwan. These are not simplifications of character structures, but rather reduction in number of total standard characters. For each set of variants with identical pronunciation and meaning, one character—usually the simplest—is elevated to the standard character set, and the rest are obsoleted. By 1993, 1027 variants were declared obsolete by this list. Among the chosen variants, those that appear in the 1986 Complete List are also simplified in character structure accordingly.

=== Novel forms ===
- New standardized character forms originated from the 1965 Characters for Printing list containing 6196 characters. These tend to be vulgar variant forms for most of its characters. The 1988 List of Commonly Used Characters in Modern Chinese (hereafter Common Modern Characters) contains 7000 characters, and replaces the 1965 list. Since the new forms take vulgar variants, many characters now appear slightly simpler compared to old forms, and as such are often mistaken as being structurally simplified.

=== Structural simplification ===
All characters simplified this way are enumerated in Chart 1 and Chart 2 in the 1986 Complete List. Characters in both charts are structurally simplified based on similar set of principles. They are separated into two charts to clearly mark those in Chart 2 as 'usable as simplified character components', based on which Chart 3 is derived.

Merging homophonous characters:

蒙、懞、濛、矇 → 蒙; 復、複 → 复; 乾、幹 → 干; 髮、發 → 发

Adapting cursive shapes (草書楷化):

書 → 书; 長 → 长; 當 → 当; 韋 → 韦; 樂 → 乐; 車 → 车; 興 → 兴; 發 → 发; 東 → 东; 專 → 专; 過 → 过; 報 → 报; 爾 → 尔; 盡 → 尽; 學 → 学

Replacing a component with a simple arbitrary symbol (such as 又 and 乂):

對 → 对; 觀 → 观; 僅 → 仅; 難 → 难; 鳳 → 凤; 這 → 这; 劉 → 刘

Omitting entire components:

廠 → 厂; 廣 → 广; 飛 → 飞; 習 → 习; 滅 → 灭; 親 → 亲; 業 → 业; 鄉 → 乡; 餘 → 余; 氣 → 气

Omitting components, then applying further alterations:

婦 → 妇; 麗 → 丽; 歸 → 归; 顯 → 显; 務 → 务

Structural changes that preserve the basic shape

繼 → 继; 龜 → 龟; 齒 → 齿; 奪 → 夺; 門 → 门; 見 → 见

Replacing the phonetic component of phono-semantic compounds:

鄰 → 邻; 斃 → 毙; 蠟 → 蜡; 鍾 → 钟; 艦 → 舰

Replacing an uncommon phonetic component:

華 → 华; 憲 → 宪; 歷、曆 → 历; 賓 → 宾

Replacing entirely with a newly coined phono-semantic compound:

護 → 护; 驚 → 惊; 藝 → 艺; 響 → 响

Removing radicals

麼 → 么; 開 → 开; 裡/裏 → 里; 餘 → 余; 關 → 关

Only retaining single radicals

廣 → 广; 親 → 亲; 產 → 产; 類 → 类; 廠 → 厂; 鄉 → 乡

Replacing with ancient forms or variants: (Note: This is very similar to the 'elimination of variants of the same character' in "Series One Organization List of Variant Characters", except that these eliminations happen in Chart 1 and Chart 2 of "Complete List of Simplified Characters". Characters simplified in Chart 2 can be further used for derivation of Chart 3, but those chosen in "Series One Organization List of Variant Characters" cannot.)

塵 → 尘; 膚 → 肤; 從 → 从; 眾 → 众; 雲 → 云; 網 → 网; 與 → 与; 無 → 无; 電 → 电

Adopting ancient vulgar variants:

體 → 体; 國 → 国; 憑 → 凭; 陽 → 阳; 陰 → 阴

Readopting abandoned phonetic-loan characters:

餘 → 余; 後 → 后; 裡/裏 → 里

Copying and modifying another traditional character:

義 → 义(乂); 髮、發 → 发(友); 龍 → 龙(尤); 頭 → 头(斗)

=== Simplifying components ===
Based on 132 characters and 14 components listed in Chart 2 of the Complete List, the 1,753 derived characters found in Chart 3 can be created by systematically simplifying components using Chart 2 as a conversion table. While exercising such derivation, the following rules should be observed:

- The Complete List employs character components, not traditional radicals. A component refers to any conceivable part of a character, regardless of its position within the character, or its relative size compared to other components in the same character. For instance, in the character 摆, not only is 扌 (a traditional radical) considered a component, but so is 罢.
  - Each of the 132 simplified characters in Chart 2, when used as a component in compound characters, systematically simplify compound characters in exactly the same way the Chart 2 character itself was simplified. For instance, 單 is simplified in Chart 2 to 单. Based on the same principle, these derivations can be made: 彈 → 弹; 嬋 → 婵; 囅 → 冁
  - The 14 simplified components in Chart 2 are never used alone as individual characters. They only serve as components. Example of derived simplification based on the component 𦥯, simplified to 𰃮, include: 學 → 学; 覺 → 觉; 黌 → 黉
- Chart 1 collects 352 simplified characters that generally cannot be used as components. Even in rare cases where a Chart 1 character is found as a component in a compound character, the compound character cannot be simplified in the same way. For instance, 習 is simplified in Chart 1 to 习, but 褶 cannot be simplified to ⿰衤习.
- A character that is already explicitly listed as simplified character in the "Complete List of Simplified Characters" cannot be alternatively simplified based on derivation. For instance, 戰 and 誇 are simplified in Chart 1 to 战 and 夸 respectively, thus they cannot be simplified alternatively by derivation via 单 and 讠in Chart 2 to 𢧐 and ⿰讠夸. 過 is simplified in Chart 2 to 过, thus it cannot be alternatively derived via 呙 in Chart 2 as 𬨨.

Sample derivations:

𦥯 → 𰃮, thus 學 → 学; 覺 → 觉; 黌 → 黉
單 → 单, thus 彈 → 弹; 嬋 → 婵; 囅 → 冁
頁 → 页, thus 顏 → 颜; 頷 → 颔; 順 → 顺; 額 → 额
專 → 专, thus 傳 → 传; 轉 → 转; 磚 → 砖
𩙿 → 饣, thus 飯 → 饭; 飽 → 饱; 飼 → 饲; 餃 → 饺
訁 → 讠, thus 話 → 话; 語 → 语; 誰 → 谁

=== Elimination of allographs ===
The Series One List of Variant Characters reduces the number of total standard characters. First, amongst each set of variant characters sharing identical pronunciation and meaning, one character (usually the simplest in form) is elevated to the standard character set, and the rest are made obsolete. Then amongst the chosen variants, those that appear in the "Complete List of Simplified Characters" are also simplified in character structure accordingly. Some examples follow:

Sample reduction of equivalent variants:

姪 → 侄; 蹤 → 踪; 恆 → 恒; 佇 → 伫; 虖、嘑、謼 → 呼; 夠 → 够

Ancient variants with simple structure are preferred:

異 → 异; 淚 → 泪; 災、烖、菑 → 灾

Simpler vulgar forms are also chosen:

傑 → 杰; 貓 → 猫; 豬 → 猪; 獃、騃 → 呆

The chosen variant was already simplified in Chart 1:

裏 → 裡 → 里; 歎 → 嘆 → 叹; 唘、啓 → 啟 → 启; 鬦、鬪、鬭 → 鬥 → 斗; 厤、暦 → 曆 → 历; 歴 → 歷 → 历

In some instances, the chosen variant is actually more complex than eliminated ones. An example is the character 搾 which is eliminated in favor of the variant form 榨. The 扌 'HAND' with three strokes on the left of the eliminated 搾 is now seen as more complex, appearing as the ⽊ 'TREE' radical 木, with four strokes, in the chosen variant 榨.

Not all characters standardised in the simplified set consist of fewer strokes. For instance, the traditional character 強, with 11 strokes is standardised as 强, with 12 strokes, which is a variant character. Such characters do not constitute simplified characters.

=== Novel forms ===
The new standardized character forms shown in the Characters for Publishing and revised through the Common Modern Characters list tend to adopt vulgar variant character forms. Since the new forms take vulgar variants, many characters now appear slightly simpler compared to old forms, and as such are often mistaken as structurally simplified characters. Some examples follow:

The traditional component 釆 becomes 米:

粵 → 粤; 奧 → 奥

The traditional component 囚 becomes 日:

溫 → 温; 媼 → 媪

The traditional "Break" stroke becomes the "Dot" stroke:

虛 → 虚; 噓 → 嘘

The traditional components ⺥ and 爫 become ⺈:

靜 → 静; 睜 → 睁

The traditional component 奐 becomes 奂:

換 → 换; 煥 → 焕

=== Inconsistencies ===
A commonly cited example of the irregularity of simplification involves characters that share the "hand" component 又 , which is used in many simplified characters. While there is an observable pattern involving the replacement of 𦰩 with 又 as seen in 漢 → 汉, 難 → 难, 癱 → 瘫, 嘆 → 叹, 灘 → 滩, when observing that 歎 → 叹, 歡 → 欢, 勸 → 劝, 灌 (not simplified) and 罐 (not simplified), an inconsistency arises. This is due to the fact that in the Complete List of Simplified Characters, 漢 → 汉 appears in Chart 1 while 難 → 难 is listed in Chart 2 and 癱 → 瘫 as a derived character in the non-exhaustive list in Chart 3. Therefore, 难 is defined as a 'simplified character component' according to the standard, while 又 is not. Based on 难, 癱 is simplified to 瘫, and 灘 to 滩. Since both 歡 → 欢 and 勸 → 劝 appear in Chart 1, they are not defined as derived characters. There are therefore no characters or components found in Chart 2 usable for derivation of 灌 and 罐. Further investigation reveals that these two characters do not appear in Chart 1 nor in "Series One Organization List of Variant Characters". Thus they remain unchanged from traditional forms in the Common Modern Characters list.

== Distribution ==
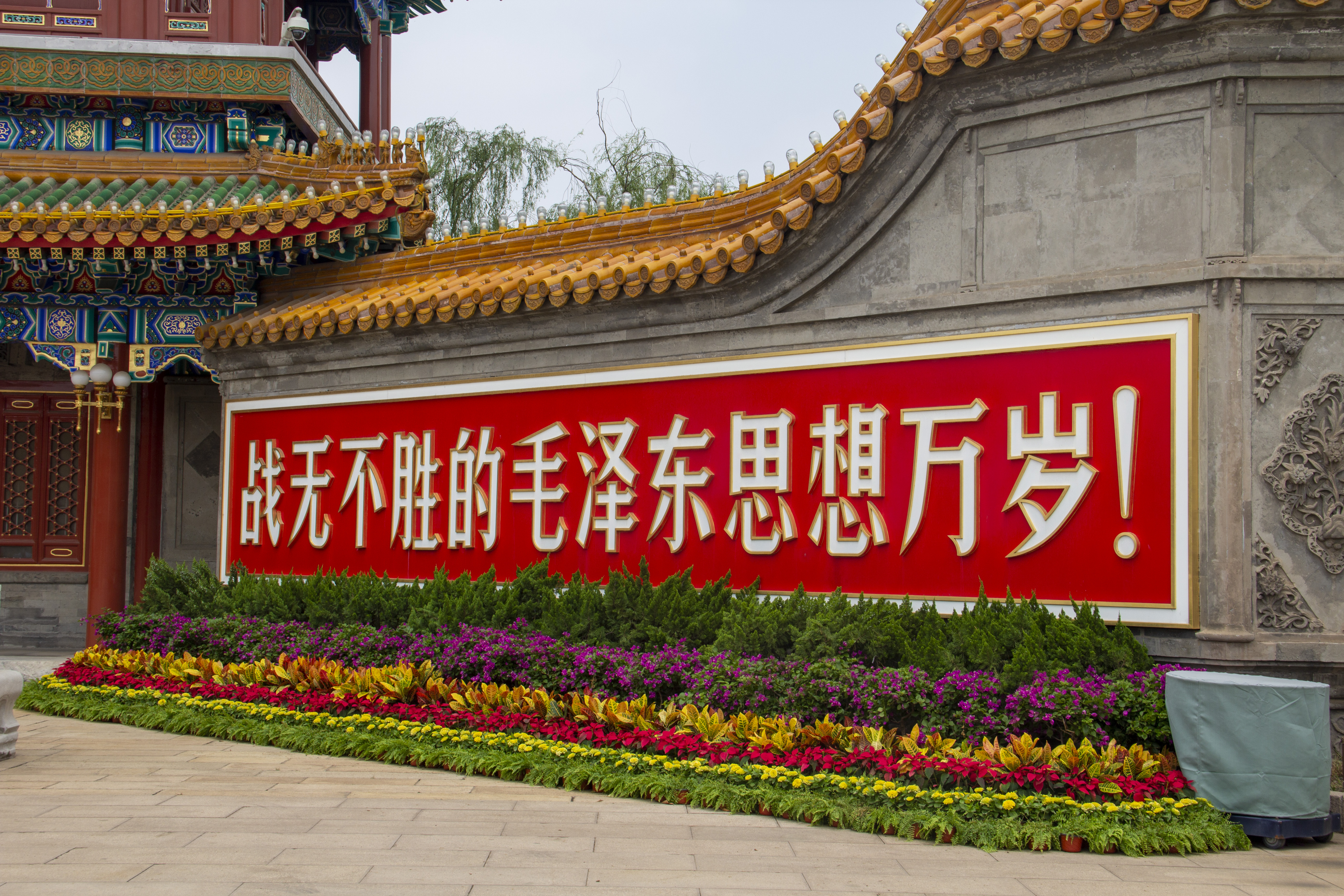
The slogan 战无不胜的毛泽东思想万岁! ('Long live the invincible Mao Zedong Thought!') written using simplified characters on Xinhua Gate in Beijing

The People's Republic of China and Singapore generally use simplified characters. They appear very sparingly in texts originating in Hong Kong, Macau, Taiwan, and overseas Chinese communities, although they are becoming more prevalent as mainland China becomes more integrated globally.

=== Mainland China ===
The Law of the People's Republic of China on the National Common Language and Characters implies that simplified Chinese characters are the country's standard script, with traditional Chinese being used for purposes such as ceremonies, cultural purposes such as calligraphy, for decoration, in publications and books on ancient literature and poetry, and for research purposes. Traditional characters remain ubiquitous on buildings that predate the promotion of simplified characters, such as former government buildings, religious buildings, educational institutions, and historical monuments. Traditional characters are also often used for commercial purposes, such as in shopfront displays and advertisements.

As part of the one country, two systems model, the PRC has not attempted to force Hong Kong or Macau into using simplified characters. The PRC tends to print material intended for people in Hong Kong, Macau and Taiwan, and overseas Chinese in traditional characters. For example, versions of the People's Daily are printed in traditional characters, and both People's Daily and Xinhua have traditional character versions of their website available, using Big5 encoding. Mainland companies selling products in Hong Kong, Macau and Taiwan use traditional characters in order to communicate with consumers; the reverse is also true.

Dictionaries published in mainland China generally show both simplified and their traditional counterparts. In digital media, many cultural phenomena imported from Hong Kong and Taiwan into mainland China, such as music videos, karaoke videos, subtitled movies, and subtitled dramas, use traditional Chinese characters.

=== Hong Kong ===
Textbooks, official statements, and newspapers show no signs of moving to simplified Chinese characters, including state-funded media. However, for example, Hong Konger students sometimes opt to write with simplified characters when taking notes or while taking exams, in order to write faster.

The use of simplified characters in Hong Kong has become politicized due to its association with cultural imposition from Mainland China, reflected in instances of protests and boycotts against the use of simplified characters in names, television subtitles, and in schools. Instead, the continued use of traditional characters has become an issue of the cultural identity of Hongkongers, being an easily-latchable social difference with mainlanders.

It is common for Hong Kongers to learn traditional Chinese characters in school, as well as some simplified characters incidentally, usually by consuming media produced on the mainland. For use on computers, however, people tend to type Chinese characters using an IME with a traditional character set, such as Big5. In Hong Kong, as well as elsewhere, it is common for people to use both sets, due to the ease of conversion between the two sets.

=== Taiwan ===
Simplified characters are not used in any official capacity in Taiwan, including in government and civil publications in Taiwan. However, they are sometimes used in calligraphy and informal handwriting. It is also legal to import and distribute publications printed in simplified characters. Specific simplified forms predating the 20th century are in common use, such as Chinese: 台, the first character in the name "Taiwan", rivalling the orthodox form Chinese: 臺 even in publications and academic contexts.

=== Southeast Asia ===
In Singapore, where Mandarin Chinese is one of the official languages, simplified characters are the official standard and are generally used in most of official publications as well as the government-controlled press. While simplified characters are taught exclusively in schools and are generally used in most of official publications, the government does not officially discourage the use of traditional characters and still allow parents to choose whether to have their child's Chinese name registered in simplified or traditional characters. Traditional characters are widely used by older Singaporeans, and are widespread on billboards, stall menus, and decorations, as well as in newspapers and on television. There is no restriction on the use of traditional characters in mass media, and television programs, books, magazines and music imported from Hong Kong and Taiwan are widely available, almost always using traditional characters. Many shop signs and menus in hawker centres and coffee shops continue to be written with traditional characters.

== In education ==
In general, schools in mainland China, Malaysia and Singapore use simplified characters exclusively, while schools in Hong Kong, Macau, and Taiwan use traditional characters exclusively.

Today, simplified Chinese characters predominate among college and university programs teaching Chinese as a foreign language outside of China, such as those in the United States.

=== Mainland China ===
In December 2004, Ministry of Education authorities rejected a proposal from a Beijing Chinese People's Political Consultative Conference (CPPCC) political conference member that called for elementary schools to teach traditional Chinese characters in addition to the simplified ones. The conference member pointed out that many, especially young people, have difficulties with traditional Chinese characters; this is especially important in dealing with non-mainland communities such as Taiwan and Hong Kong. The educational authorities did not approve the recommendation, saying that it did not fit in with the "requirements as set out by the law" and it could potentially complicate the curricula. A similar proposal was delivered to the first plenary session of the 11th CPPCC in March 2008.

=== Hong Kong ===
Most, if not all, Chinese-language textbooks in Hong Kong are written in traditional characters. Before 1997, the use of simplified characters was generally discouraged by educators. After 1997, while students are still expected to be proficient and utilize traditional characters in formal settings, they may sometimes adopt a hybrid written form in informal settings to speed up writing.

=== Singapore, Malaysia and Indonesia ===
Chinese textbooks in Singapore, Malaysia and Indonesia are written exclusively in simplified characters, and only simplified characters are taught in school. Traditional characters are usually only taught to those taking up calligraphy as a co-curricular activity or Cantonese as an elective course at school.

=== Chinese as a foreign language ===
The majority of textbooks teaching Chinese are now based on simplified characters and Hanyu Pinyin – although there are textbooks originating in China which have a traditional version. For practical reasons, universities and schools prepare students who will be able to communicate with mainland China, so their obvious choice is to use simplified characters.

In places where a particular set is not locally entrenched, such as Europe and the United States, instruction is now mostly simplified, as the economic importance of mainland China increases, and also because of the availability of textbooks printed in mainland China. Teachers of international students often recommend learning both systems.

==== Europe ====
In the United Kingdom, universities mainly teach Mandarin Chinese at the undergraduate level using the simplified characters coupled with pinyin. However, they will require the students to learn or be able to recognise the traditional forms if they are studying in Taiwan or Hong Kong (such as taking Cantonese courses). In Australia and New Zealand, schools, universities and TAFEs use predominantly simplified characters.

Russia and most East European nations are traditionally oriented on the education of the PRC's system for teaching Chinese, which uses simplified characters but exposes the learners to both systems.

==== East Asia ====
In South Korea, universities have used predominantly simplified characters since the 1990s. In high school, Chinese is one of the selective subjects. By the regulation of the national curricula standards, bopomofo and traditional characters had been originally used before (since the 1940s), but by the change of regulation, pinyin and simplified characters have been used to pupils who enter the school in 1996 or later. Therefore, bopomofo and traditional characters disappeared after 1998 in South Korean high school Chinese curriculum.

In Japan there are two types of schools. Simplified Chinese is taught instead of traditional Chinese in pro-mainland China schools. They also teach Pinyin, a romanization system for standard Chinese, while the Taiwan-oriented schools teach bopomofo, which uses phonetic symbols. However, the Taiwan-oriented schools are starting to teach simplified Chinese and pinyin to offer a more well-rounded education.

==== Southeast Asia ====
In the Philippines, the use of simplified characters has become increasingly popular. Before the 1970s, Chinese schools in the Philippines were under the supervision of the Ministry of Education of the Republic of China. Hence, most books were using traditional characters. Traditional characters remained prevalent until the early 2000s. Institutions like the Confucius Institute, being the cultural arm of the People's Republic of China, are strong proponents of the use of simplified characters. Also, many schools are now importing their Mandarin textbooks from Singapore instead of Taiwan.

Public universities such as the Linguistics and Asian Languages Department of the University of the Philippines use simplified characters in their teaching materials. On the other hand, private schools such as Chiang Kai Shek College and Saint Jude Catholic School remain major proponents of the usage of traditional characters. Some private universities, such as the Ateneo de Manila University, also use simplified characters.

== Use with computers ==
In computer text applications, the GB encoding scheme most often renders simplified Chinese characters, while Big5 most often renders traditional characters. Although neither encoding has an explicit connection with a specific character set, the lack of a one-to-one mapping between the simplified and traditional sets established a de facto linkage.

Since simplified Chinese conflated many characters into one and since the initial version of the GB encoding scheme, known as GB 2312-80, contained only one code point for each character, it is impossible to use GB 2312 to map to the bigger set of traditional characters. It is theoretically possible to use Big5 code to map to the smaller set of simplified character glyphs, although there is little market for such a product. Newer and alternative forms of GB have support for traditional characters. In particular, mainland authorities have now established GB 18030 as the official encoding standard for use in all mainland software publications. The encoding contains all East Asian characters included in Unicode 3.0. As such, GB 18030 encoding contains both simplified and traditional characters found in Big-5 and GB, as well as all characters found in Japanese and Korean encodings.

Unicode deals with the issue of simplified and traditional characters as part of the project of Han unification by including code points for each. This was rendered necessary by the fact that the linkage between simplified characters and traditional characters is not one-to-one. While this means that a Unicode system can display both simplified and traditional characters, it also means that different localisation files are needed for each type.

In font filenames and descriptions, the acronym SC is used to signify the use of simplified Chinese characters to differentiate fonts that use TC for traditional characters.

=== Internet usage ===
The World Wide Web Consortium (W3C)'s Internationalization working group recommends the use of the language tag zh-Hans as a language attribute value and Content-Language value to specify web-page content in simplified Chinese characters.

== Criticism ==
Author Liu Shahe was an outspoken critic of the simplification of Chinese characters. He wrote a dedicated column entitled "Simplified Characters are Unreasonable" in the Chinese edition of the Financial Times.

Some critics pejoratively refer to Simplified Chinese as 殘體字 (pinyin: cántǐzì), meaning "crippled characters."

== See also ==
- Ambiguities in Chinese character simplification
- Chinese Character Simplification Scheme
- Differences between Shinjitai and Simplified characters
- Modern Chinese characters
- Ryakuji
- Second round of simplified Chinese characters
- Shinjitai
- Singapore Chinese characters
