= Language policy in China =

Policies and laws regarding Chinese languages

Language policy in the People's Republic of China (PRC) includes the policies and laws designed to promote the Beijing variety of Standard Mandarin Chinese as the country's primary language. Chinese Language Policy includes all laws and planning designed to elevate and enforce the use of Standard Chinese.

By 1912, Mandarin Chinese was promoted in the planning for China's first public school system. By 1956, it was promoted as the common language of China, based on the Beijing dialect. June Dreyer argues that Chinese language policy is heavily influenced by Soviet language policy, in which different nationalities' languages are said to be promoted. In practice, the various Chinese languages are treated as varieties of Mandarin and are not protected. Han Chinese, who comprise 90% of the population of the People's Republic of China are all considered one nationality and so learn the Beijing dialect of Mandarin as their national language.

In practice, Mandarin Chinese is the prestige language of the People's Republic of China, and is used for all areas of governance, enterprise and official communication. The Chinese Language Law was the first specialised law on spoken and written language in China, adopted on the 31st of October 2000. The law lays out the use of Chinese in the country, as the most spoken language, and which norms and standards should be followed for its proper usage. The law stipulates that Standard Chinese with standardised Chinese logographs would be the national standard language in the People's Republic of China.

The State Language Commission is the official language regulator of China and is directed by the Ministry of Education of the People's Republic of China. Its remit includes the standardisation of national languages as well as the implementation of laws introduced by the State Council on languages. They are tasked with the creation of Pinyin and publish lists of Standard Chinese characters by usage.

Human Rights Research argues that the policies created by the CCP can be considered a strategy of sinicisation and are primarily targeted at autonomous territories of the PR China. These territories are Tibet, Xinjiang, Inner Mongolia and Guangdong. However, they are not limited to these regions.

== Cantonese ==
Cantonese, is one of the most widely spoken dialects in China, spoken by approximately 80 million people as of 2023. From a linguistic perspective, Cantonese is a group of dialects spoken in the south-eastern region of China. Regions including Guangdong Province, Guangxi Province, Hong Kong and Macao regard Cantonese as an important cultural heritage and symbol. However, different language policies on Cantonese within and outside mainland China, resulting in distinct outcomes and unequal development.

=== Guandong Province ===
In 2000, Mandarin and Standard Chinese characters were established as the national general language. To promote social integration and mobility between local and migrant residents (non-Cantonese speakers), Guangdong's provincial government introduced Guangdong national language regulations in 2012. This policy significantly reduced the presence of Cantonese in education, media and public service dimensions. Schools strictly adopt Mandarin as their teaching language, with teachers under 40 required to pass the Mandarin test. In radio, television and government advocacy, Mandarin also serves as the primary language.

The undermined status of Cantonese has led to local resistances. In 2010, Guangzhou residents engaged in a large-scale protest over the replacement of broadcasting language in television programmes, viewing Mandarin as a threat to the existence of the local language and cultural identity. Although the government publicly emphasised the importance of Cantonese as a local culture, in practice, linguistic diversity was restricted under the excuse of “cultural preservation”. Mandarin is continuously shaped as an instrument for national unity and social progress, legitimising its privileged status while marginalizing Cantonese to a symbol of local culture and only permitted in informal and private spaces.

=== Hong Kong ===
After Hong Kong returned to China in 1997, the government set English and Chinese as official language. Meanwhile, Trilingual and Biliterate policy was introduced in education system, which means writing in Chinese and English, and speaking in Cantonese, Mandarin and English. This policy aims to balance the functions of 3 different languages: maintaining Hong Kong's status as an international metropolis, strengthening connection with the Mainland while preserving Cantonese as unique culture.

However, in contrast to Guangdong, the promotion of Mandarin does not alter the linguistic structure. A survey in 2021 found that over 6.5 million of Hong Kong residents considered Cantonese as their mother tongue. Across all domains including education, workplace, television programming and entertainment, Cantonese is the primary and most preferred language in Hong Kong. The use of Mandarin is mainly restricted to specific situations, such as Chinese language lessons, communication with mainland clients, or a limited number of media channels.

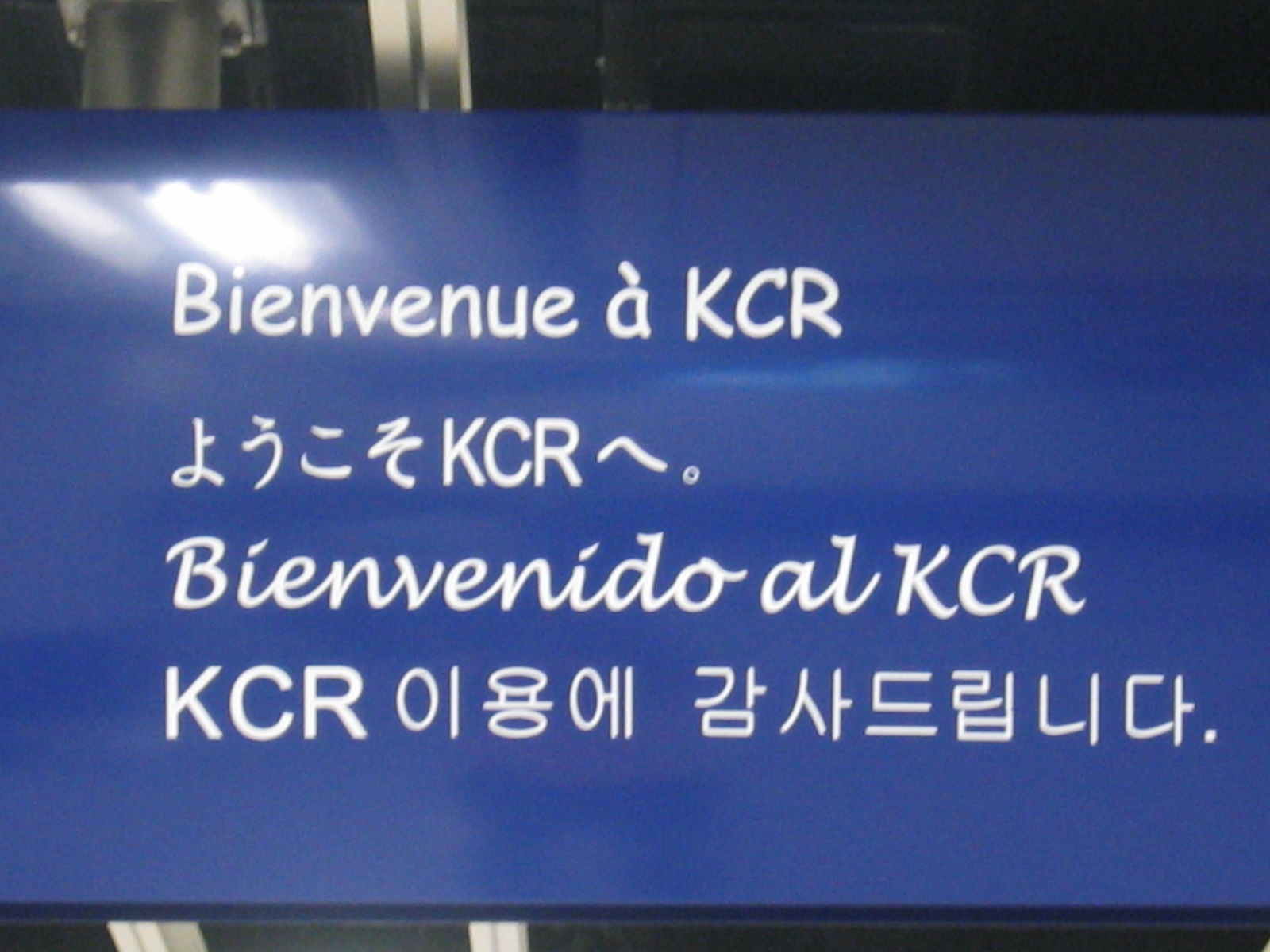
Part of a multilingual welcoming signboard at the former KCR East Tsim Sha Tsui station. (From the top: French, Japanese, Spanish and Korean).

Nonetheless, TIME magazine pointed out that the culture and expressive space for Cantonese has been progressively suppressed since the enactment of National Security law in 2020. The report suggested that the act of speaking or promoting Cantonese has become politicised. Moreover, the long-term status of Cantonese in Hong Kong is also questioned. While Cantonese currently remains dominant, its position is fragile compared to Mandarin and English due to its lack of legal recognition as an official language and institutional safeguards.

== Xinjiang ==
Xinjiang Uyghur Autonomous Region is home to a linguistically diverse population, with Uyghurs forming the largest ethnic minority group. Historically, Uyghur has been the primary language of education and daily life used by an estimated 10–12 million people, alongside Mandarin Chinese and Kazakh.

Since the 1950s, the People's Republic of China has formally recognised Uyghur as an official language within the region, and bilingual education policies were introduced to provide instruction in both Uyghur and Mandarin. Uyghur is officially designated as one of four class II languages in China, affording it certain protections under Chinese law.

From the early 2000s onwards, however, the regional government increasingly shifted towards a “monolingual, monocultural model” of language policy in Xinjiang.

=== Education ===
The Central Government's 2004 plan consolidated Mandarin as the primary language of education in all Xinjiang schools with little preparation, raising the issue of unfair competition between those with Mandarin as their first language and those without.

In 2017, the Xinjiang regional government announced that Mandarin would become the primary language of instruction at all levels of schooling. Minority languages were retained only as separate language subjects, with even most “bilingual education” conducted in Mandarin. In 2021, Uyghur language textbooks were banned and their authors imprisoned on charges of “separatism”.

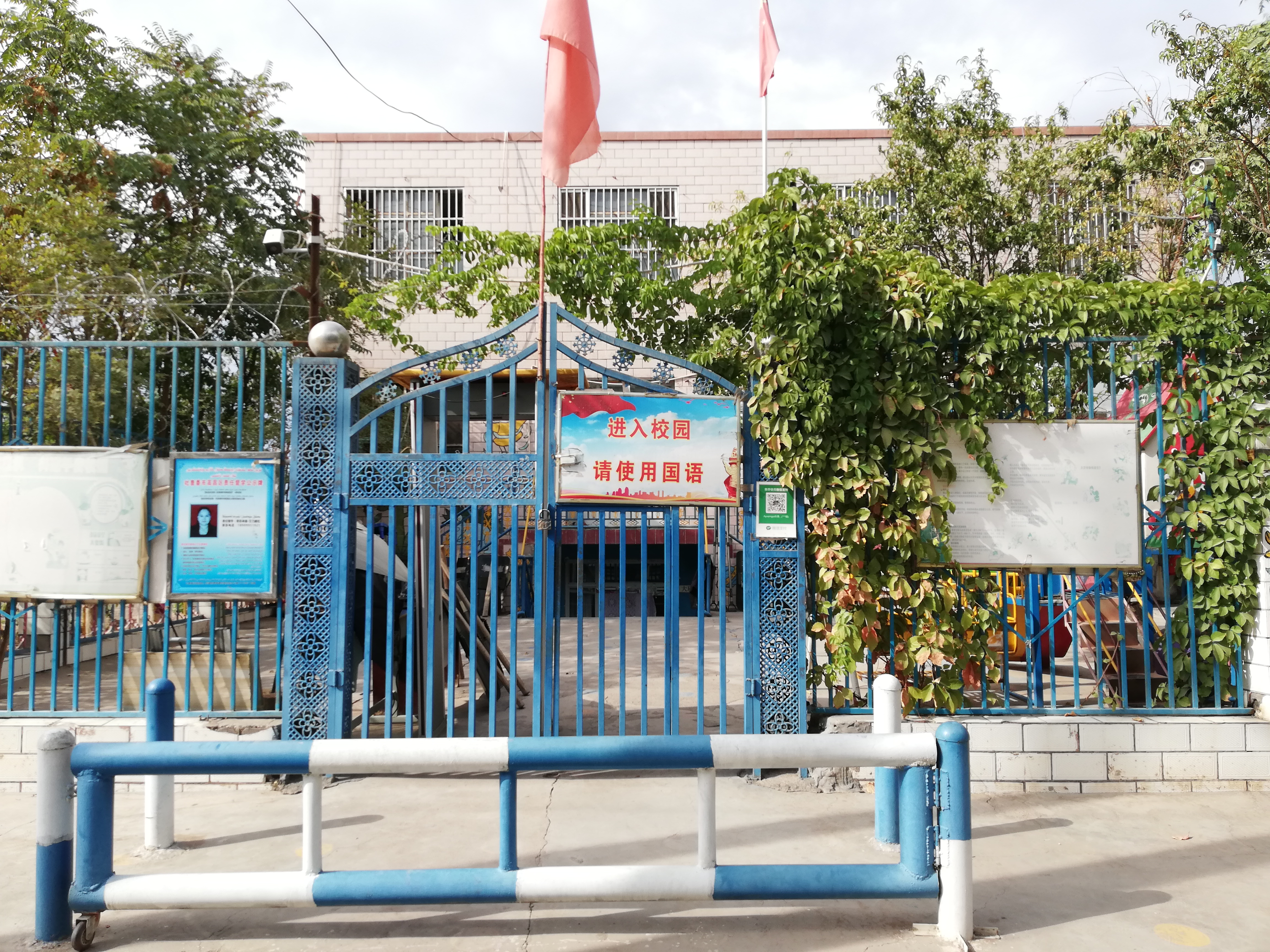
Entrance to a school in Turpan, a Uyghur-majority city in Xinjiang, in 2018. The sign at the gate, written in Chinese, reads: "[You are] entering the school grounds. Please speak Guoyu ["the national language", i.e. Mandarin Chinese]"

The shift in language policy has become a point of contention in Xinjiang. Uyghur advocacy groups argue that the dominance of Mandarin threatens the survival of the Uyghur language. At the same time, state authorities maintain that bilingual education ensures equal opportunities in a national economy where Mandarin is the lingua franca.

While Uyghur remains used in cultural and religious contexts and publications in Uyghur are still permitted, restrictions have tightened, and usage among younger generations is declining. UN reports have documented the closure of Uyghur-language schools in Hetian Prefecture, reduced media output in Uyghur, and greater scrutiny of Uyghur-language publishing houses and websites, including arrests of staff. At the same time, the state has promoted Mandarin through literacy campaigns, teacher training, and technology such as Mandarin-only digital platforms.

=== Criticism ===
Critics, including Human Rights Watch, the Congressional-Executive Committee on China, and the United Nations Committee on the Elimination of Racial Discrimination, have argued that these reforms undermine the protection of minority languages and contribute to the erosion of Uyghur cultural identity. Such policies also, it is alleged, give economic advantages to Mandarin-speaking Han migrants to Xinjiang over native Uyghur speakers, as these must work or study in their second language. However, officials justified this as necessary to improve economic mobility and national integration for Uyghurs.

Academic David Tobin has argued that the language policies imposed on Xinjiang are a key pillar of the allegations of genocide in Xinjiang. International scholars of language policy, including Arienne Dwyer, have described the shift as part of a broader assimilationist approach, linking language planning to the CCP's broader policies in Xinjiang.

The Chinese Government maintains that these policies have promoted national integration and created greater economic opportunities for Uyghurs.

== Tibet ==
=== Historical Context ===
Tibet is a significant region for examining language policy due to its long history of linguistic and cultural distinctiveness and its complex political relationship with the Chinese state. Tibetans have used their written language for over 3,000 years, making it one of the oldest continuous literary traditions in Asia. However, since Tibet came under the control of the People's Republic of China in the 1950s, the region has experienced frequent and often politically driven shifts in language policy. These policies reflect broader state goals of national integration and social stability. Particularly during the Cultural Revolution (1966–1976), the Tibetan language was banned from education and public life, marking the beginning of state intervention in language use. Although Tibetan was briefly reintroduced into schools in the 1980s, the 1995 Law on Education and the 2000 Law on the National Standard Spoken and Written Language have firmly established Mandarin as the dominant language of instruction, effectively undermining constitutional protections for minority language rights.

=== Contemporary Language Policy ===
China's current language policy in Tibet promotes Mandarin Chinese as the primary language of education and public life, while significantly reducing the use of Tibetan. Under Xi Jinping, a stricter "one nation, one language" model has been enforced, replacing Tibetan-medium schooling with Mandarin instruction, including in early education. Tibetan-language schools have been closed, private Tibetan classes restricted and language activists prosecuted. Although the Chinese government claims the policy improves national unity and opportunities, critics argue it accelerates cultural assimilation and threatens the survival of the Tibetan language.

=== Criticism and International Response ===
China's language policy in Tibet has generated opposition both within the region and internationally. Inside Tibet, local communities have organised protests against the decline of Tibetan-medium education and the expansion of Mandarin as the main language of instruction, with some schools being closed and teachers detained as a result of resistance. Advocacy for Tibetan language rights has led to the arrest of several language activists, including Tashi Wangchuck, who was sentenced to five years in prison after publicly calling for the protection of Tibetan language education. International organisations such as the Tibetan government-in-exile, human rights NGOS and inter-parliamentary alliances have condemned these policies as a violation of minority cultural rights and an act of forced assimilation. UN experts and international legal scholars argue that China's “Sinicisation”, particularly the boarding system and Mandarin-only instruction, are a breach of the UNESCO declarations on linguistic rights, which direct respect for cultural distinction in education. Groups have called for reforms to reinstate such freedoms as part of a wider effort to emancipate Tibetan culture and identity.

== Inner Mongolia ==
The Inner Mongolia Autonomous Region can be used as a key case study in the implementation of language policy in the People's Republic of China, illustrating the shift from regional linguistic accommodation to a stronger emphasis on the national language, Standard Mandarin Chinese. The region is home to over four million ethnic Mongols (17.7% of the region in 2020) whose mother tongue has been the traditional Mongolian language and script. Owing to its status as one of five autonomous regions, it originally enjoyed institutional recognition for Mongolian‐language use in education, media and local administration under China's ethnic regional governance framework.

=== Policy and Implementation ===
Many schools in Inner Mongolia offered Mongolian‐medium instruction alongside classes in Chinese and English. For example, a 2001 study noted that bilingual (Mongolian/Chinese) education was the dominant model. Since the early 2000s, the regional education system has undergone increasing Sinicization.

In August 2020 the region's education authorities announced major reforms: from the autumn term of 2020, first‐grade classes (and progressively other grades) in ethnic language schools would switch core subjects, namely Chinese Language and Literature, Morality and Law, and History, to Mandarin using the nationally unified textbooks. The stated rationale was to promote a common national language, strengthen social cohesion, and enhance educational equality, whereas critics argue it is part of a one language assimilation policy.

By 2023, reports indicated that Mongolian‐medium instruction had been severely reduced or eliminated in many schools, with Mongolian as a subject marginalised and Mandarin-trained teachers deployed in the region.

=== Criticism and International Response ===
The 2020 reform announcement sparked large-scale protests by ethnic Mongolian students, parents and educators across the region. Schools in the region reported strike actions and boycotts in response to perceived threats to the Mongolian language and identity.

Human rights groups, including Human Rights Watch and PEN International, argue that the reforms undermine minority‐language rights and cultural preservation.

Internationally, the reforms have drawn criticism for being part of a broader assimilationist trend among China's ethnic autonomous regions, also seen in Xinjiang and Tibet.
