= Guangzhou Television Cantonese controversy =

Controversial proposal to replace Guangzhou TV broadcasting from Cantonese to Mandarin

In July 2010, the Chinese People's Political Consultative Conference (CPPCC) Guangzhou Committee, in a written proposal to mayor of Guangzhou Wan Qingliang, suggested increasing Mandarin programming on Guangzhou Television's main and news channels. The proposal sparked widespread controversy, met with fierce criticism in native Cantonese-speaking cities including Guangzhou and Hong Kong, which eventually triggered a mass protest in the former city. In a formal response, Guangzhou TV rejected the proposal, citing "historic causes and present demands" as reasons for Cantonese-Mandarin bilingualism.

== Background ==
=== Mandarin as the official language ===
Beijing made Mandarin (also known as Putonghua) the nation's sole official language in 1982, leading to bans on other languages at many radio and television stations. This status was confirmed by the Law of the People's Republic of China on the Standard Spoken and Written Chinese Language, which went into effect on January 1, 2001. This law implements the provision in the Constitution of China that the state promotes nationwide use of the language.

=== Use of Cantonese on television ===
Due to Mandarin's status as the official language, use of the country's other languages in television as well as radio and film is rigorously restricted by the State Administration of Radio, Film, and Television (SARFT). Permission from national or local authorities is required for using a dialect as the primary programming language at radio and television stations.

In 1988, the Ministry of Radio, Film, and Television, predecessor of the SARFT, approved the use of Cantonese by Guangdong TV in GDTV Pearl River Channel and Guangzhou TV as a countermeasure against the influence of Hong Kong television in the Pearl River Delta region. TVS-* (TVS2 in Guangdong) is another major channel in China offering Cantonese programming and is the only Cantonese channel permitted to be broadcast worldwide via satellite.

=== Decline of Cantonese in younger generations ===
Despite having been approved for use in local television, Cantonese still faces restrictions and challenges in other aspects of social activities, which contributes to the decline of the language, particularly in the younger generations.

In elementary and secondary schools, the medium of instruction is mandated by law to be Mandarin. Use of Mandarin is also ubiquitously promoted in schools. In contrast, few, if any, local schools offer classes on Cantonese, although this is not explicitly forbidden by law.

In the past few years, there have been a number of newspaper reports about students in Guangzhou being punished for speaking Cantonese in school and even outside the classroom. One elementary school in Yuexiu, Guangzhou reportedly requires students to speak Mandarin not only in classes but also during their spare time, and threatens to deduct points from their records if they fail to comply. This has caused some children to become reluctant to learn and use Cantonese or unable to understand or communicate in Cantonese at times.

Also contributing to the decline is the influx of migrant population into Guangzhou as a result of the city's economic and developmental advantages in the country. The migrant worker population in China is estimated to be a huge 250 million, with most of them in big cities like Shanghai, Beijing and Guangzhou. Guangdong is the major destination of migrant workers in China, there is estimated to be over 20 million migrant workers. According to authorities, a big part of the migrant workers in Guangdong province come from Hunan. Increase of non-Cantonese-speaking population in the city leads to an increased number of non-Cantonese-speaking teachers in schools, forcing students to speak Mandarin on more occasions than Cantonese. Non-Cantonese speakers' name-callings online during debates, such as calling Cantonese as language for "barbarian", "uncivilized", "uneducated" people etc., has further deepened the hostility between the two groups.

Despite some decline in Cantonese usage in Guangdong province, its survival is still doing better than other Chinese dialects due to the local cultural prestige, pride, popularity, and especially with the wide availability and popularity of Cantonese entertainment and media from both Guangzhou and especially from Hong Kong, which is maintaining the encouragements of the local Cantonese speakers to want to continue to preserve their culture and language versus other Chinese dialectal speaking regions which are much more limited with their encouragements to maintain their local dialects as they have very limited to no media or entertainment outlets to cater to their local dialects. Back in the 1980s-90s, migrants from many parts of China settling in Guangzhou or anywhere in Guangdong showed more interest to learning Cantonese and wanting to integrate into the local cultural environment seeing it as trendy and rich due to the popularity of Hong Kong entertainment, but since the 2000s, the newer migrant settlers increasingly showed less interest in the local culture and very often strictly demanding the official obligations of the local residents to command speaking Mandarin as the official Chinese language to them. Though as of the 2020s, some additional renewed efforts to preserve the Cantonese language and culture have been introduced with some schools in Guangzhou now starting to teach some limited Cantonese language classes, activities related to Cantonese language and culture and as well as hosting Cantonese appreciation cultural events. Many local Cantonese speaking families in Guangdong province overall in general including in Guangzhou have started placing more stronger emphasis to encourage the use of Cantonese with their children to preserve the local language and culture. In a 2018 report study by Shan Yunming and Li Sheng, the report showed that 90% of people living in Guangzhou are bilingual in both Cantonese and Mandarin, though fluency will vary depending on if they are locally born to the city and the surrounding Guangdong province or migrants from other provinces, which shows how much importance the Cantonese language still has in the city despite the strict policy rules from the government to be using Mandarin as the country's official language.

Although there have been some declines of new migrants willing to learn Cantonese when arriving into the Guangdong province including the city of Guangzhou compared to in the past, there are still significant amounts of new migrants that still show interest in wanting to learn Cantonese and immerse into the culture in the province especially in Guangzhou and other surrounding outlying towns and this is all due to the wide availability and popularity of Cantonese entertainment and many engage with the local Cantonese speaking residents whom show a lot of cultural pride in their culture. There are two Cantonese language TV competition game shows in the Guangdong province, which they are based in Guangzhou called, Speaking Cantonese The Better (simplified Chinese: 粤讲越掂; traditional Chinese: 粵講越掂; pinyin: Yuè jiǎng yuè diān; Jyutping: jyut6 gong2 jyut6 dim6) and Classic Cantonese Culture (simplified Chinese: 粤韵风华; traditional Chinese: 粵韻風華; pinyin: Yuè yùn fēng huá; Jyutping: jyut6 wan5 fung1 waa4) showing contestants trying to prove how much they know Cantonese language and the traditional Cantonese culture. Speaking Cantonese The Better consist of contestants who are natively from other parts of China, but have settled to Guangzhou or other surrounding towns and have willingly signed up to be a contestant on the show and compete against each other to prove how much Cantonese language and culture they have learned from being in the region with some of them having decent fluency in the language and culture while some are much more limited in such. Its name itself is a pun, as 粵 (Cantonese) and 越 (to exceed) are homophones, both pronounced as yuè/jyut6. Classic Cantonese Culture are mainly school age contestants locally from different parts of the Guangdong province including from Guangzhou as well as even from Hong Kong and Macau where they compete with each other and are put to the test of how much they know about their own Cantonese language and culture. These shows are examples of how Cantonese language and culture is still thriving in the local province including in Guangzhou and still attract some significant amount of new migrants to want to immerse in learning the Cantonese language and culture as well as there are still significant amounts of local youths still having pride in their own Cantonese language and culture despite China's strict influential policies of using Mandarin as the official language.

Guangxi, the neighbor province, used to be a Cantonese-speaking area, especially in the capital Nanning. Since the promotion of Mandarin from the 1990s, the number of Cantonese speakers has been dropped to less than 30% according to an unofficial statistic years later, most of who are the elder generations. Besides the decline of Cantonese in Guangzhou, there is also fear of Cantonese declining in Hong Kong. Stephen Matthews, an associate professor of linguistics at the Chinese University of Hong Kong commented that "It is difficult to calculate the timing but in the medium- to long run, Cantonese is an endangered language". He added "It might survive for 50 years or so but after 50 years it may well be on its way out". Thomas Lee, professor of linguistics at the Chinese University of Hong Kong doesn't believe the situation is as stark, but maintains that Cantonese needs to stay in the mainstream education or it will end up like Shanghainese, now spoken by less than 50% of the Shanghainese people. Even as far away as overseas, the Chinatowns have seen Cantonese being pushed out by Mandarin, reflecting different immigration patterns. Peter Kwong, professor of Asian American studies at Hunter College in New York City commented that "Mandarin's ascent comes with the realignment of power in Chinese-American communities, where the recent (non-Cantonese) immigrants are gaining economic and political clout".

=== Earlier moves by Guangzhou TV in adopting Mandarin ===
In 2009, Guangzhou TV shifted its Financial Channel from Cantonese to Mandarin at a cost of 30 million yuan. Following the transition, viewership of the channel plummeted from 0.34 to 0.09. The main channel's lunchtime news program reverted to Cantonese in January 2010 due to low ratings.

=== New Preservation Attempts ===
In early 2026, Mayor Sun Zhiyang of Guangzhou announced plans to increase protections of preserving the Cantonese language and culture in the city despite still facing some challenges with attempting preserve the language. From the YouTube video called Will the Cantonese still be able to spread? Documentary of a 17-year-old girl from Guangzhou stated that Hong Kong University of Science and Technology had conducted a study about Cantonese in Guangzhou that roughly 47% of Guangzhou residents still often communicate in Cantonese but for the demographic residents born in 2000 or onward; less than 35% could speak Cantonese.

== CPPCC Guangzhou Committee proposal ==
=== Survey ===
Prior to submission of the proposal to the local government, in June 2010, the CPPCC Guangzhou Committee conducted an online survey on GZTV's broadcasting on its website. In response to a question concerning increasing Mandarin programming, of the 30,000 respondents, among whom two thirds were Guangzhou natives, a dominating 79.5% opposed the increase in favor of maintaining the current Cantonese-to-Mandarin ratio, while only a meager 19.5% were in support.

=== Proposal ===
In spite of opposition expressed through the survey, in July 2010, the CPPCC Guangzhou Committee officially submitted a proposal titled Suggestions on Further Enhancing Construction of Asian Games Soft Environment to Guangzhou mayor Wan Qingliang, which explicitly voiced that Guangzhou TV should increase Mandarin programming by either adopting Mandarin as its primary programming language or converting all prime-time programs into using Mandarin and serving reruns in Cantonese.

We suggest converting the Guangzhou TV's Main and news channels into a channel with Mandarin as the primary programming language, or changing prime-time programming of these channels into using Mandarin.

— CPPCC Guangzhou Committee, at a conference on about Further Planning of Asian Games Soft Environment

=== Proposal rationale ===
For Guangzhou to reach out nationwide, Guangzhou TV must use Mandarin.

— Ji Keguang, vice-chair of proposal committee of CPPCC Guangzhou Committee, in words to mayor Wan Qingliang

In explaining the rationale for the proposal, the CPPCC Guangzhou Committee cited allowing satellite broadcasting of Guangzhou TV programs, an idea supported by 82.1% of the respondents in the online survey, as the main reason. Among municipal television stations of the five Major Cities named by the Chinese Ministry of Housing and Urban-Rural Development, Guangzhou TV is the only one whose main channel is not broadcast nationwide via satellite, because the majority of its programs are in Cantonese, while Mandarin programming is one of the requirements of SARFT approval for nationwide broadcasting. The CPPCC Guangzhou Committee also asserted that only if Guangzhou TV achieved nationwide broadcasting would Guangzhou live up to its status as a Chinese Major City, and it would also facilitate more people to know about Guangzhou.

== Reactions ==
=== Reactions of local citizens and netizens ===
Responses to the CPPCC Guangzhou Committee's proposal were generally negative, especially those from local citizens and netizens; only a minority of reactions were positive. In response to media interviews, local citizens expressed concerns about the possibility of Cantonese being lost, particularly in the younger generations, although there were also more optimistic and neutral opinions.

A pro-Cantonese poster in Maoist style, text reads Cantonese people speak Cantonese. If you don't understand Cantonese, go home.

Netizens created artworks that satirized the proposal and promoted Cantonese. Some made a sarcastic poster mimicking that of the movie Echoes of the Rainbow. The title of the poster, Echoes of the Cantonese (simplified Chinese: 碎粤神偷; traditional Chinese: 碎粵神偷, literally "The Cantonese Thief"), has the same pronunciation as that of the movie in both Cantonese and Mandarin. Some others made a poster taking the style of Maoist style propaganda posters that were popular before the 1990s, with text reading "Cantonese speak Cantonese, if you can't understand Cantonese, go home".

On July 11, 2010, a group of youngsters carried out a flash mob-style gathering in the People's Park in Guangzhou to promote Cantonese, singing famous 1980s Cantopop.

==== July 25, 2010, mass assembly ====
2010 Guangzhou Campaign to Support Cantonese
- 25 July Campaign to Support Cantonese; Part of protests and dissents in China
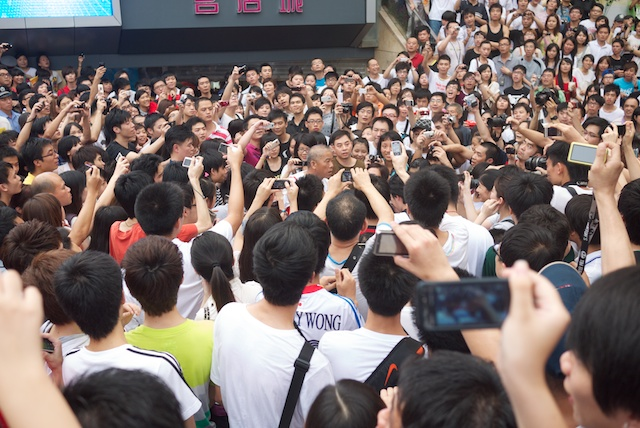
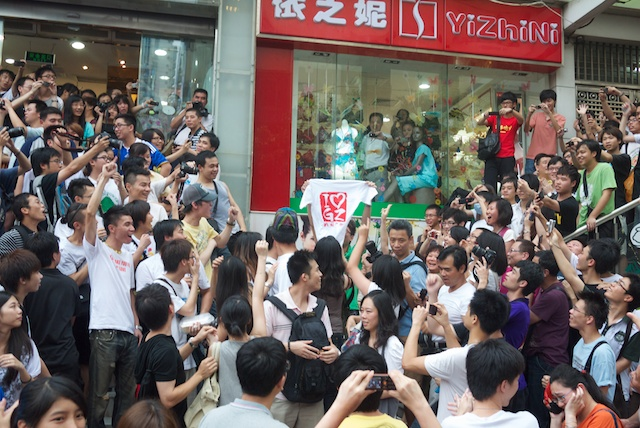
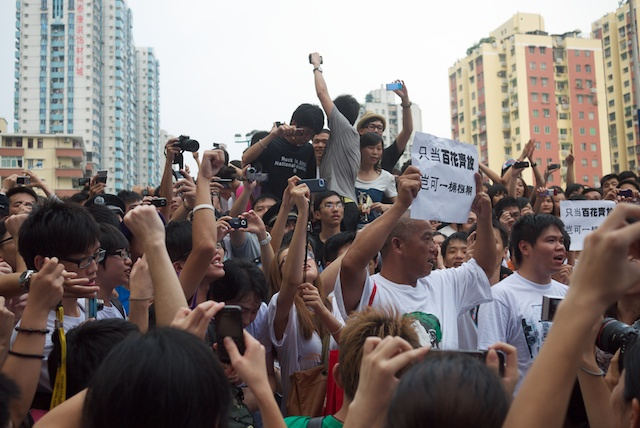
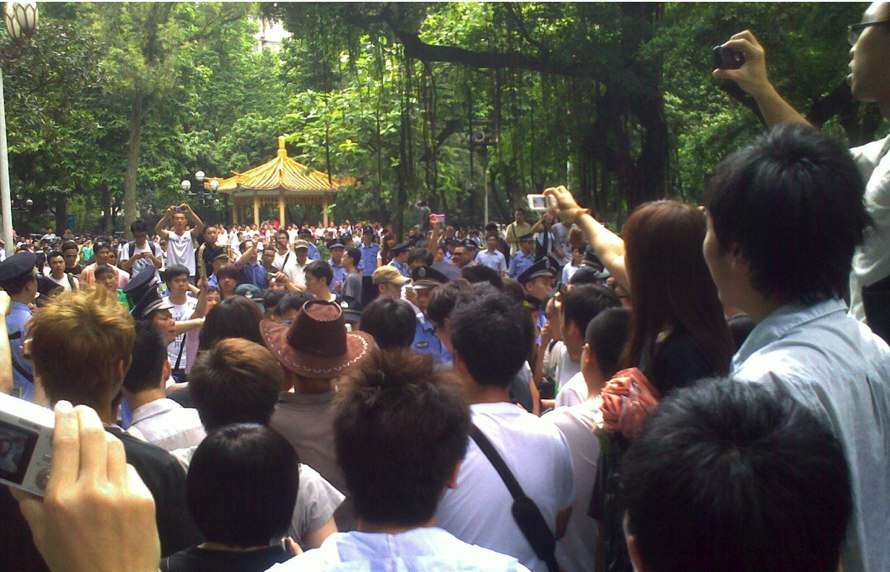
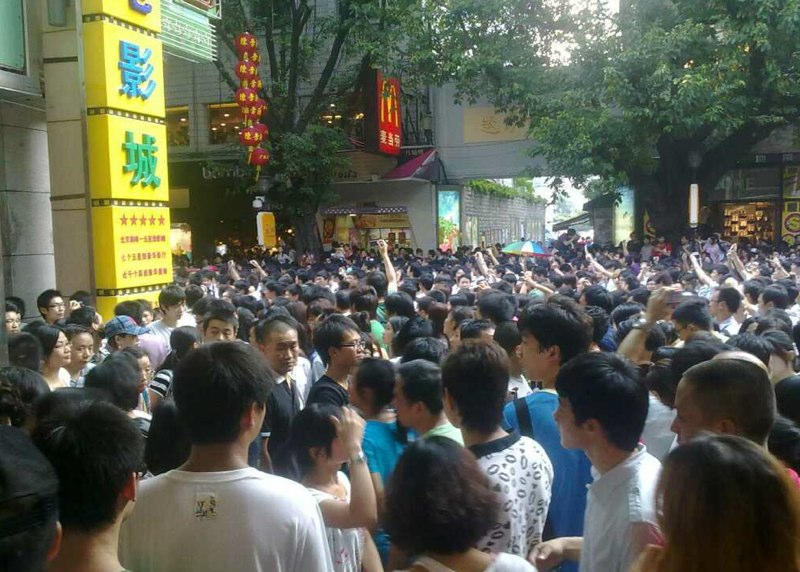
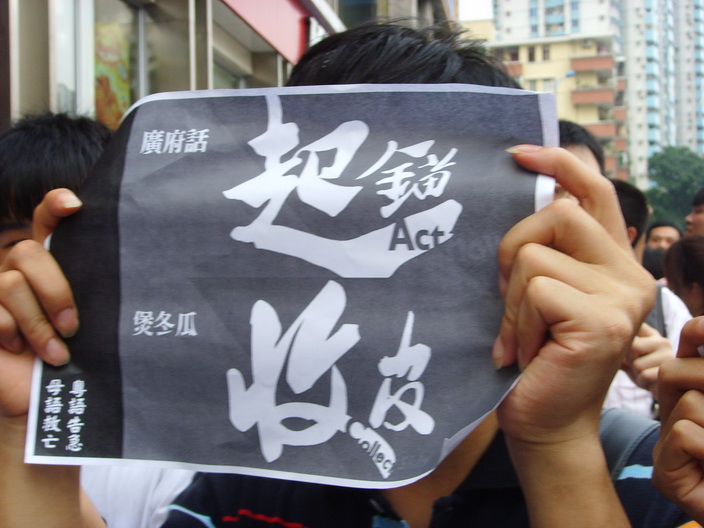
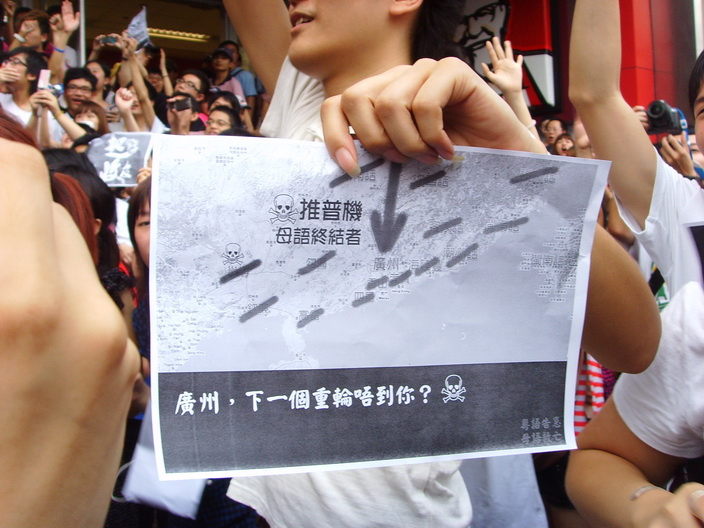
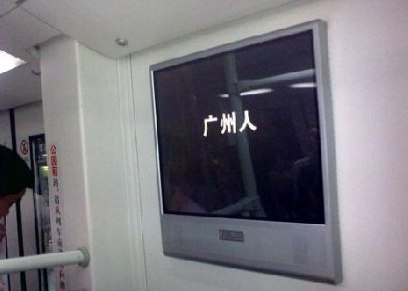
- Date: 25 July–September 2010 (CST; UTC+08:00)
- Location: Guangzhou, Guangdong, China
- Caused by: CPPCC Guangzhou Committee's proposal to increase the use of Standard Chinese in Guangzhou Television
- Methods: Demonstrations, Internet activism

Parties
Protesters	Guangdong Provincial Public Security Department

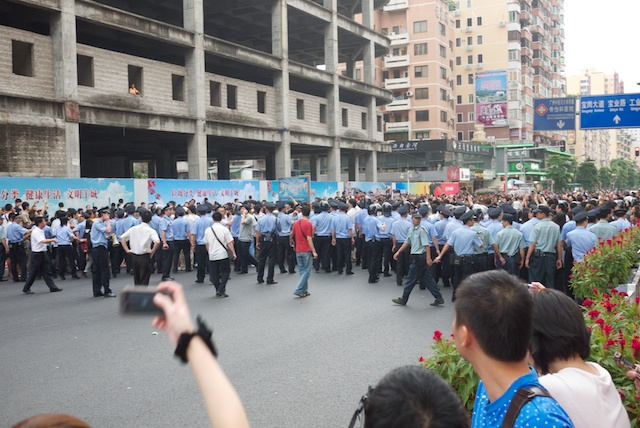
Police on the scene

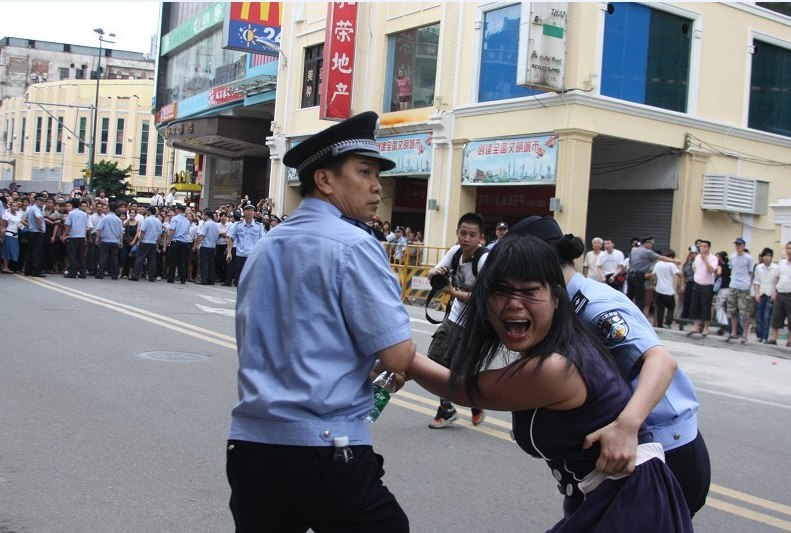
Police restraining a woman protester

On July 25, 2010, a crowd of about 10,000 gathered at 5pm in the surroundings of Guangzhou Metro's Jiangnanxi station in a protest to criticize the CPPCC Guangzhou Committee's proposal and support Cantonese. Organizers of the activity had informed local police in advance, but were forced by the authorities to cancel it. People, however, gathered regardless.

During the gathering, the crowd shouted slogans promoting Cantonese, including the battle cry of a famous Cantonese general, Yuan Chonghuan, and mocking at Ji Keguang, who was believed to be the most active supporter in the CPPCC Guangzhou Committee; they also sang Glorious Years by Beyond. Despite its size, the crowd stayed peaceful and maintained order.

Local police were dispatched to the scene and exercised restraint throughout, and there was no physical clashes between the protesters and the police. The crowd was dispersed at 6:30pm, when dusk fell and it started to rain.

=== Reactions of notable personalities ===
Han Zhipeng, a member of the CPPCC Guangzhou Committee, expressed his opposition after release of the proposal, saying, "Cantonese is the carrier of Lingnan culture, and the mother tongue of Guangdong people; it is also a bond connecting overseas Chinese, for most of them speak only Cantonese." He further suggested introducing a new Mandarin channel instead of reducing Cantonese programming.

Zeng Zhi, director of GZTV's General Editor Office, questioned satellite broadcasting as a motivation for GZTV shifting to Mandarin, saying that nationwide broadcasting was a complicated and difficult issue, and might not be attained even if Cantonese was ditched.

Chen Yang, who is celebrated by local television audience for his blunt criticism of government policies and behaviors when hosting News Eyes for GZTV since the show's inception in February 2004 until being forced to leave in December 2008, sighed, "Cantonese is in degeneracy... Behind a dialect forced into extinction there must be a weakened culture."

Zhan Bohui, honorary director of Jinan University's Chinese Dialect Research Centre, defended the proposal, declaring that increasing Mandarin was to cater to the migrant population in Guangzhou, to whom Cantonese was unintelligible.

Ji Keguang, the most prominent proponent of the proposal, when requested for comment on the 90% agreement to Cantonese programming in the online survey, responded with "They need guidance", which eventually put him at the center of criticism from local citizens and netizens. Ji also downplayed the feasibility of introducing a new Mandarin channel as he believed that a new channel would be very costly and lack time to mature before the 2010 Asian Games.

=== Reactions of government officials ===
Wang Yang, secretary of the Chinese Communist Party (CCP) Guangdong Committee, noted in a session of the committee on July 16, 2010, that the important upcoming work was "education, to enlighten and culture the people with education". The remark was interpreted by the Hong Kong-based Apple Daily as the authorities maintaining a hard-line stance against popular calls to protect Cantonese.

Su Zhijia, deputy secretary of the CPC Guangzhou Committee, explicitly denied the existence of "popularizing Mandarin while abolishing Cantonese" in an interview with Guangzhou TV on July 20, 2010, saying that the government had no intentions to abandon or weaken Cantonese. Meanwhile, he still encouraged local citizens to master Mandarin and use the language on formal occasions and in public places, reflecting the government's policy of promoting it.

=== Reactions of Guangzhou TV ===
In a formal response, Guangzhou TV rejected the proposal, citing "historic causes and present demands" as reasons for Cantonese-Mandarin bilingualism.

== Official response ==
Guangzhou city hall deputy Ouyang Yongsheng responded by saying "Cantonese dialect is Cantonese people's native tongue and is also Lingnan area's dialect. Guangzhou according to law, according to rule, according to heart, according to reason would never do something to 'promote Mandarin while abolishing Cantonese'." Other terms which gained popularity among netizens include 'the fall of Cantonese'. A suspect from Hubei was arrested for instigating the event with ulterior motives.

== Rallies ==
On 1 August 2010, hundreds of people gathered in People's Park, Guangzhou. About 20 people were taken away by police. Three of them were journalists from Now TV, two from Cable TV and one from Reuters. Others gave the figure at 3000 people attending the Guangzhou rally with 7 journalists arrested. A protester asked a police officer why he was carried away for protecting his own culture as he was not breaking any laws. Another person in the rally said he has never seen that many police in his entire life. About 200 people attended another rally in Hong Kong at the same time in Southorn Playground in Wan Chai.

At the end of August, a 24-year-old woman, a native of Guangzhou, was revealed to have started the campaign with her friends on 11 July asking Cantonese speakers to sing Cantonese songs. Government officials called at her home and warned her not to take part in any campaign, but she believed the campaign should continue.

On 18 and 19 September 2010, Hong Kong activist Cai Shufang and blogger Zhong Shuangyu led the global Cantonese supporting assembly. However, because of the preparation by the Chinese government, the assembly only been held on time in Hong Kong and United States.

Yet in December 2011, the Government of Guangdong promoted a new rule that took effect on 1 March 2012, stating that all government workers, teachers, conference holders and TV/radio host were to use Mandarin rather than dialects such as Cantonese in public appearances, and any Cantonese (or Hakka or Teochew) language TV or radio shows will be broadcast only after permission is granted by the government. This once again brought controversy to Guangzhou Television. However, authorities said this rule still permits usage of Cantonese or other dialects in daily life or public appearances.

== See also ==
- Linguistic rights
- National political concerns of the Francization of Belgium
- Protection of the varieties of Chinese
