= Zhang Zhixin =

Chinese dissident (1930–1975)

- 张志新
- Born: 5 December 1930; Tianjin, Republic of China
- Died: 5 April 1975 (aged 44); Dawa Execution Ground, Hunnan District, Shenyang, Liaoning, China
- Cause of death: Execution by firing squad
- Resting place: Shenyang Huilonggang Revolutionary Cemetery
- Monuments: Mengshi Statue in People's Park, Guangzhou
- Education: Renmin University of China
- Occupation: Propagandist
- Era: Cultural Revolution (1966–1976)
- Known for: Criticism of Mao Zedong and the Cultural Revolution Group
- Political party: Chinese Communist Party
- Criminal charges: Counter-revolutionary speech; "Attacking and slandering Chairman Mao"
- Criminal penalty: Indefinite imprisonment; Death
- Spouse: Zeng Zhen (m. 1955)
- Children: 2
- Parents: Zhang Yuzao (father); Hao Yuzhi (mother)

Zhang Zhixin (Chinese: 张志新; pinyin: Zhāng Zhìxīn; Wade–Giles: Chang Chih-hsin; 5 December 1930 – 4 April 1975) was a dissident member of the Chinese Communist Party (CCP) during the Cultural Revolution who became famous for criticizing the idolization of Mao Zedong, who she described as "right-wing". She was imprisoned for six years (1969 to 1975) and tortured, then executed, for her views which contradicted those of Cultural Revolution leaders. A second CCP member who had expressed agreement with Zhang was sentenced to 18 years in prison.

Many consider her a heroine among the people for standing up to the Gang of Four.

She was rehabilitated by Hu Yaobang and recognized as a revolutionary martyr and a model Communist.

== Early life ==
Zhang Zhixin was born in Tianjin in 1930. She was educated at Renmin University of China from 1951 to 1952 and later worked in the university. Zhang later became a member of the propaganda department for the Liaoning Provincial Committee of the Chinese Communist Party.

Zhang Zhixin
- Simplified Chinese: 张志新
- Traditional Chinese: 張志新
Transcriptions
Standard Mandarin
- Hanyu Pinyin: Zhāng Zhìxīn
- Wade–Giles: Chang Chih-hsin

Zhang expressed her view:

I have doubts about Jiang Qing. What's wrong with making critical remarks about her? Why shouldn't Jiang Qing's problems be revealed? We should even expose the Central Cultural Revolution Group.... Why should we go along with the notion that even if you do not understand, you must obey? If this is allowed to continue, the situation will get out of control. This is all an effort to fortify Chairman Mao's reputation and that of Lin Biao. I personally have no trust in Lin Biao.

== Imprisonment ==
Zhang was reportedly imprisoned for her loyalty towards Liu Shaoqi. She saved up 2 yuan a month to purchase books to read in the facility, where she wrote her study notes on toilet paper. She also reportedly wrote slogans attacking Mao Zedong personally, including "boil Mao Zedong in oil", "hang Mao Zedong" and "cut Mao Zedong into pieces", which was a serious crime according to the Six Articles on Public Security of 1967. The prison guards then took her pen away. She proclaimed that the CCP would be "punished by history; if not sooner, then later". For a year and a half she was frequently shackled in leg irons and tied in a harness.

== Death and posthumous rehabilitation ==
Zhang was sentenced to death by Shenyang Intermediate People's Court, which was approved by Liaoning Provincial Higher People's Court and finally by Jiang Hua, president of the Supreme People's Court, on 3 April 1975.

Zhang was executed on 4 April 1975. Some sources have stated that she was paraded while others say the execution was secret. It was reported by journalist Chen Yushan in 1997 that Zhang's larynx was slit before the execution, in order to prevent her from speaking; former prisoner Su Tieshan's research clarified that Zhang's vocal cords were severed by the prison's medical clinic and her throat was not actually slit.

On 16 October 1978, the Intermediate People's Court of Yingkou City, Liaoning Province, revoked the original judgment and acquitted Zhang Zhixin. Four years after her execution, in the spring of 1979 she was officially proclaimed a 'martyr'; 4 April 1979 was designated the day of her memorial. Although an investigation was begun into her case, Hu Yaobang had it stopped.

Zhang was celebrated in the post-Cultural Revolution era as a hero who stood up to those like the Gang of Four. She was promoted as a martyr, in part related to the posthumous rehabilitation of Liu Shaoqi's reputation. Among the cultural depictions of Zhang is her appearance as a character during a solo dance in The Song of the Chinese Revolution.

== Memorial ==
In People's Park in central Guangzhou, a statue named Mengshi (The Brave) has been raised to commemorate Zhang Zhixin. The statue depicts a nude female warrior shooting an arrow on horseback, and the inscription on its pedestal reads "dedicated to people who struggle for truth". In 1979, Shanghai Television produced a TV drama based on the life of Zhang Zhixin, titled . In 2019, the Chinese government listed Zhang Zhixin as one of the “Most Beautiful Strivers.”

== See also ==
- Jonathan Chaves, "A Devout Prayer of the Passion of Chang Chih-hsin," Modern Chinese Literature Newsletter, Vol. 6, No. 1 (Spring 1980), pp. 8–24.
