= Yayan (disambiguation) =

Yayan most commonly refers to Yayan Ruhian (born 1968), an Indonesian actor.

Yayan could also refer to:

- Yayan (Old Chinese), theorized ancient form of Chinese
- Yayan Ganda Hayat Mulyana (born 1966), Indonesian diplomat
- Zhu Yayan (born 1944), Chinese politician
- Lai Yayan or Megan Lai (born 1979), Taiwanese actress and singer
