= People's Park (Guangzhou) =

Public park in Guangzhou, Guangdong, China

- Renmin Park, Central Park
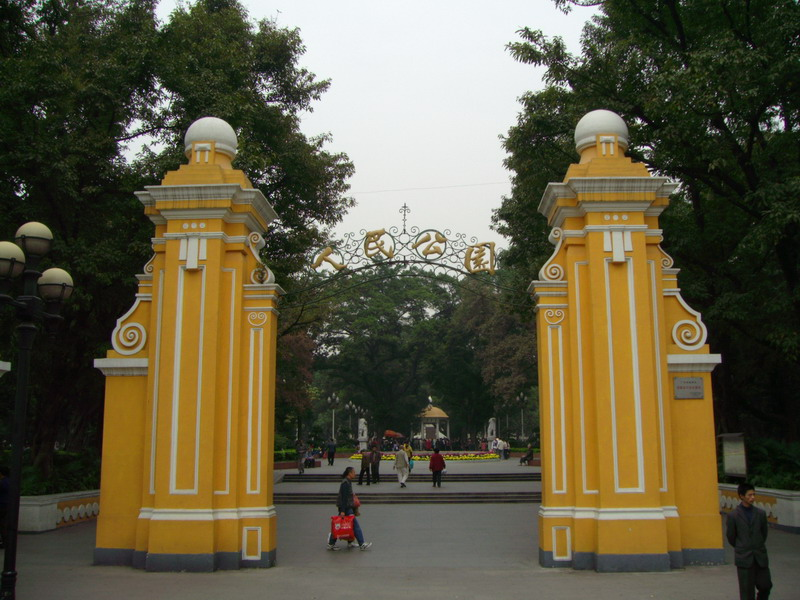
- Front gate of People's Park
- Interactive map of People's Park
- Type: Urban park
- Location: Guangzhou, Guangdong, China
- Coordinates: 23°7′36.4″N 113°15′52″E
- Created: 1921
- Designer: Yang Xizong

People's Park (Chinese: 人民公园; pinyin: Rénmín Gōngyuán) is an urban public park in Yuexiu District in central Guangzhou, capital of Guangdong province in south China. Established in 1921, it is the first public park in the city, built on the site that had been the location of successive regional governments since the Sui dynasty (581–618 AD). Due to its central location, it is colloquially called Central Park (中央公园).

== History ==
=== Imperial China ===
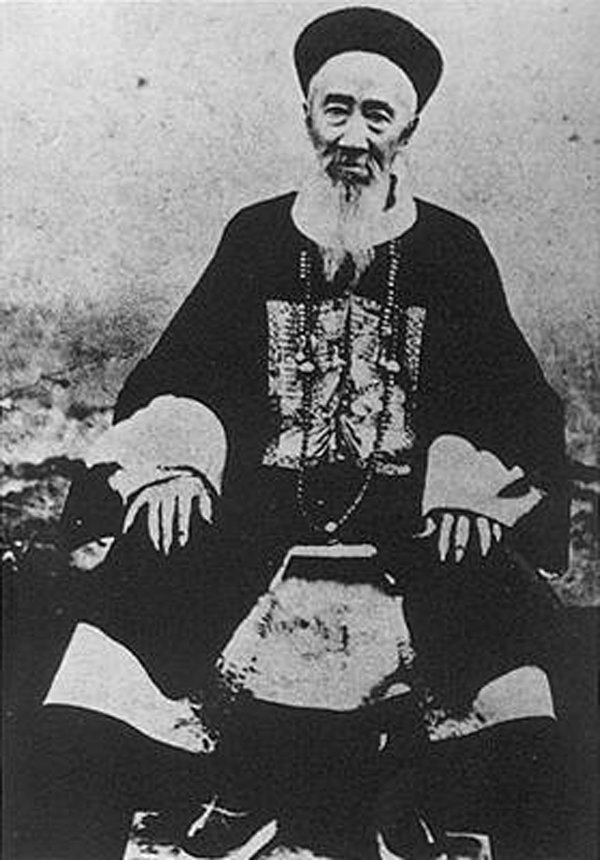
Zhang Zhidong, Viceroy of Liangguang, lived and worked in what is now People's Park.

After Emperor Wen of the Sui dynasty reunited China in 589 AD, he reorganized the administrative divisions of China, and established the capital of Guangzhou Prefecture at Nanhai County, in modern central Guangzhou. The government of Guangzhou was then built at the site of People's Park.

For over a millennium, People's Park had been the site of Guangzhou or Guangdong's regional government. At the end of the Ming dynasty, after most of northern China was conquered by the Manchu Qing dynasty, the Ming prince Zhu Yuyue proclaimed himself the Shaowu Emperor in Guangzhou, with his palace located at People's Park. After the Qing forces captured Guangzhou in 1647, Shaowu committed suicide and Guangdong became the domain of general Shang Kexi, titled King of Pingnan, who continued to have his palace at People's Park.

After Shang Kexi's son Shang Zhixin participated in the failed Revolt of the Three Feudatories, the Qing court put him to death in 1680 and took direct control of Guangdong. People's Park became the office and residence of governors and viceroys. A series of officials, including Ruan Yuan and Zhang Zhidong, made improvements to the area. Ruan named its garden "Wanzhu" (ten thousand bamboos).

During the Second Opium War (1856–60), the joint British and French force occupied Guangzhou for three years. Realizing they could not govern the city by themselves, they installed a puppet government headed by Bogui, an ethnic Mongol who had been the Qing acting governor of Guangdong. A grand inauguration ceremony was held in the park, which was considered a humiliating event by the defeated Chinese.

=== Republic of China ===
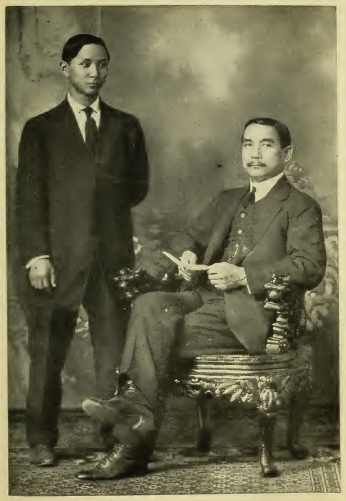
Sun Yat-sen and his son Sun Fo in 1911

After the Xinhai Revolution overthrew the Qing, Sun Yat-sen, the founding father of the Republic of China, proposed converting the former site of the Qing provincial government to Guangzhou's first public park. The city government commissioned Yang Xizong (杨锡宗), a graduate of Cornell University, to design the park. On 12 October 1921, Guangzhou No. 1 Park was inaugurated by Mayor Sun Fo, the son of Sun Yat-sen. As Yang designed the park in a Western model, numerous ancient trees on the site were cut down to achieve the desired geometric symmetry. The original park was twice the size as today, with features such as fountains, sculptures, an assembly building, restaurants, and a shooting range, but largely devoid of trees. As the first public park of the city, it was immediately popular with the citizens. New trees have since been planted in the park.

Due to its location at the center of the city, the park quickly became a main spot for rallies and major public events in Guangzhou. On 24 February 1924, Sun Sat-sen presided over a memorial service for Vladimir Lenin; on 8 March the same year, China's first major celebration of the International Women's Day was held in the park. The park also saw the great celebration of the victory of Kuomintang's Northern Expedition which was launched from Guangzhou, and the inauguration ceremonies of many government officials.

The park was a popular site for festivals. From 11 February 1923, a narcissus festival was held in the park for five days. Between 1930 and 1949, five chrysanthemum festivals were held in the park.

=== People's Republic of China ===
After the Chinese Communist Party defeated the Kuomintang in the civil war to establish the People's Republic of China in 1949, the park was renamed as People's Park. In 1999, the government demolished the wall that enclosed the park and various buildings attached to it, making the park completely open.

The park has become a popular meeting place for local homosexuals. On 25 August 2009, after police crackdown on gay meeting places in Guangzhou, about 100 gay men publicly protested in the park in defense of gay rights. According to Human Rights Watch, the protest is hailed as a milestone in the history of LGBT rights in China.

On 1 August 2010, during the Guangzhou Television Cantonese controversy, hundreds of people gathered in the park to protest the proposal to increase Mandarin programming at the expense of Cantonese. The government considered the demonstration illegal and arrested more than 20 people for "questioning". The government eventually backed down from the proposed restriction in Cantonese broadcasting.

== Statues ==
The park features six groups of statues, including Fenghuo Niandai (Age of Warfare) by sculptor Li Hanyi (李汉仪), depicting a female guerrilla fighter breastfeeding her baby. Another statue, of a nude woman shooting an arrow on horseback, commemorates Zhang Zhixin, a dissident executed during the Cultural Revolution for criticizing the idolization of Mao Zedong. Other statues commemorate the writer Lu Xun and the musician Xian Xinghai.

== Transportation ==
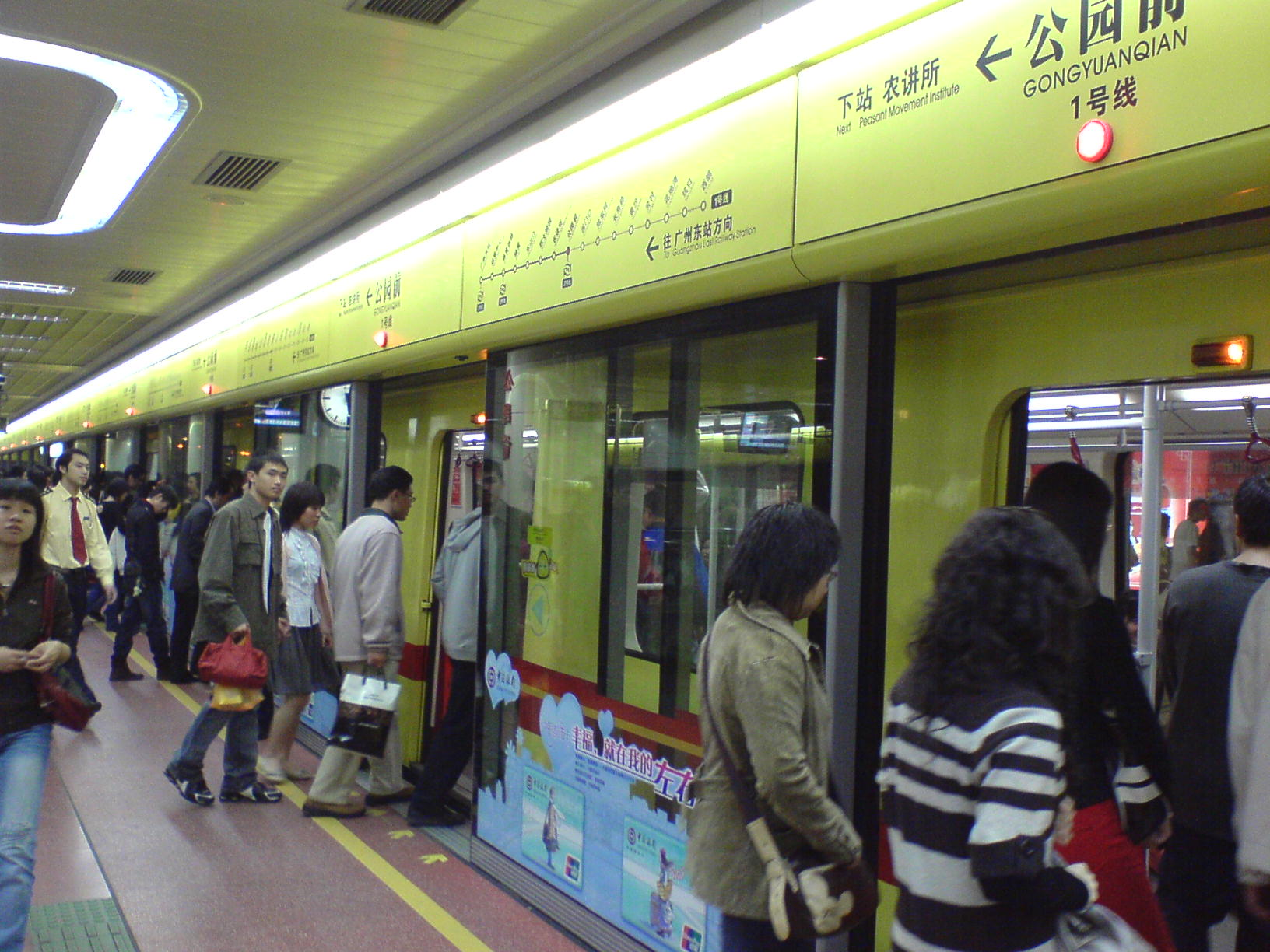
Gongyuanqian Station underneath People's Park

People's Park is served by Gongyuanqian Station (literally "park front"), a major transfer station on Line 1 and Line 2 of the Guangzhou Metro.
