= Guangdong National Language Regulations =

Chinese provincial language law

- Simplified Chinese: 广东省国家通用语言文字规定
- Traditional Chinese: 廣東省國家通用語言文字規定
Transcriptions
Standard Mandarin
- Hanyu Pinyin: Guǎngdōng shěngguó jiātōng yòng yǔyán wénzì guīdìng
Yue: Cantonese
- Jyutping: Gwong2 dung1 saang2 gwok3 gaa1 tung1 jung6 jyu5 jin4 man4 zi6 kwai1 ding6

Alternative Chinese name
- Simplified Chinese: 废粤推普
- Traditional Chinese: 廢粵推普
Transcriptions
Standard Mandarin
- Hanyu Pinyin: Fèi yuè tuī pǔ
Yue: Cantonese
- Jyutping: Fai3 jyut6 teoi1 pou2

The Guangdong National Language Regulations are a set of laws enacted in 2012 by the Government of Guangdong to promote the use of Standard Chinese in broadcast and print media at the expense of the local varieties of Chinese—namely Cantonese, Hakka and Teochew. It has been labelled as "pro-Mandarin, anti-Cantonese" legislation (廢粵推普、推普廢粵). The law was signed and came into effect on 1 March 2012.

== Law ==
The regulations generally require broadcasts in Guangdong to use Standard Chinese, with programs and channels in other varieties able to broadcast if approved by the national or provincial government. In addition, public signage is to be written using simplified characters, with exceptions for historical sites, pre-registered logos, or when approved by the state. In addition, government employees, including teachers, conference holders, broadcasters, and TV staff are required to use Standard Chinese. Public brands, seals, documents, websites, signs, and trade names are not to use traditional characters or character variants.

Guangdong governor Zhu Xiaodan signed the law, and set 1 March 2012 as the date for it to take effect.

== Responses ==
The signing has triggered massive negative responses in Guangzhou, Hong Kong and Macau. There were talks of raising movements. The effects of the law were characterized as tantamount to the elimination of autochthonous Cantonese culture. On 24 December 2011, the Guangdong government held a press conference stating that the regulation does not in fact ban Cantonese; one official stating that such a ban will never occur. Currently, the Guangdong province has two channels approved to broadcast mainly in Cantonese, while various other channels and radio stations have dialect programs.

== See also ==
- Promotion of Standard Chinese
- Chinese language law
- Protection of the varieties of Chinese
- Debate on traditional and simplified Chinese characters
