= Promotion of Standard Chinese =

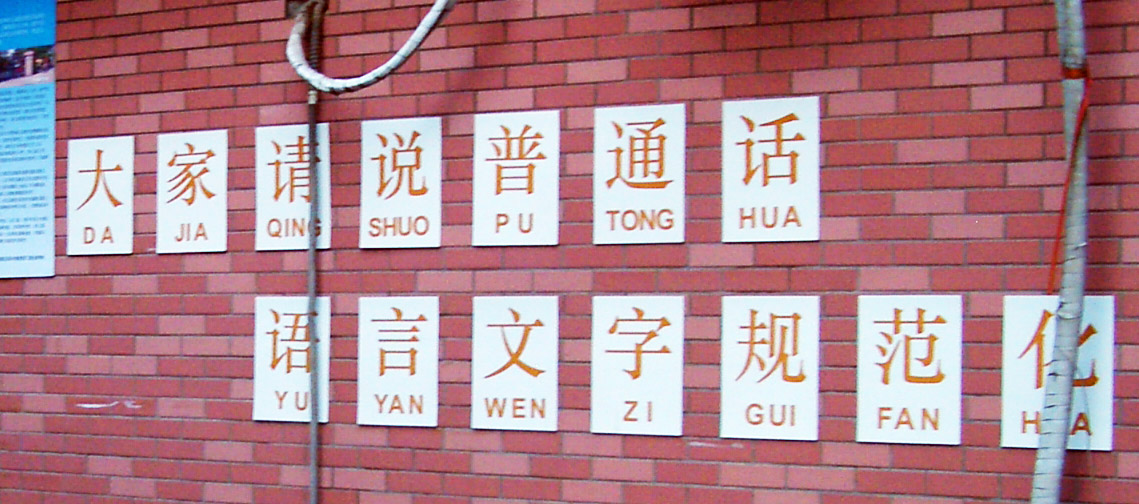
- A slogan written on the wall of a Shanghai kindergarten, which reads 大家请说普通话 语言文字规范化 ("Let everybody speak Standard Chinese, and standardize speech and spelling")
- Simplified Chinese: 推广普通话
- Traditional Chinese: 推廣普通話
Transcriptions
Standard Mandarin
- Hanyu Pinyin: tuīguǎng pǔtōnghuà

Abbreviated name
- Chinese: 推普
Transcriptions
Standard Mandarin
- Hanyu Pinyin: tuīpǔ

The promotion of Standard Chinese, abbreviated as Tuipu (推普), is a campaign by the government of the People's Republic of China, with the stated goal being to facilitate easier communication throughout the country, which has historically spoken many mutually unintelligible varieties of Chinese, as well as non-Sinitic languages. Currently, the promotion of Standard Chinese is organized by the State Language Work Committee, a regulatory agency within the Chinese government.

These efforts aim to promote the social application of Putonghua, defined as the language with "Beijing pronunciation as the standard pronunciation, Northern dialects as the foundational dialect, and exemplary modern vernacular Chinese writings as the grammatical norm."

Initially, the campaign intended to prepare for the complete abolition of Chinese characters in favor of implementing a romanization of Chinese writing system (Pinyin) as part of a broader "script reform." However, the focus shifted to the promotion of simplified Chinese characters and Pinyin instead. Currently, the promotion of Putonghua is overseen by the State Language Commission (SLC).

At present, broadcast and television media on the mainland generally use Putonghua as the standard reporting language. While Putonghua has become mainstream, there have been calls for the preservation of regional dialects. The government acknowledges that dialects are valuable cultural assets but maintains that this recognition does not conflict with the implementation of policies and measures related to Standard Chinese promotion.

== Overall regulations and policies ==
=== Article ===
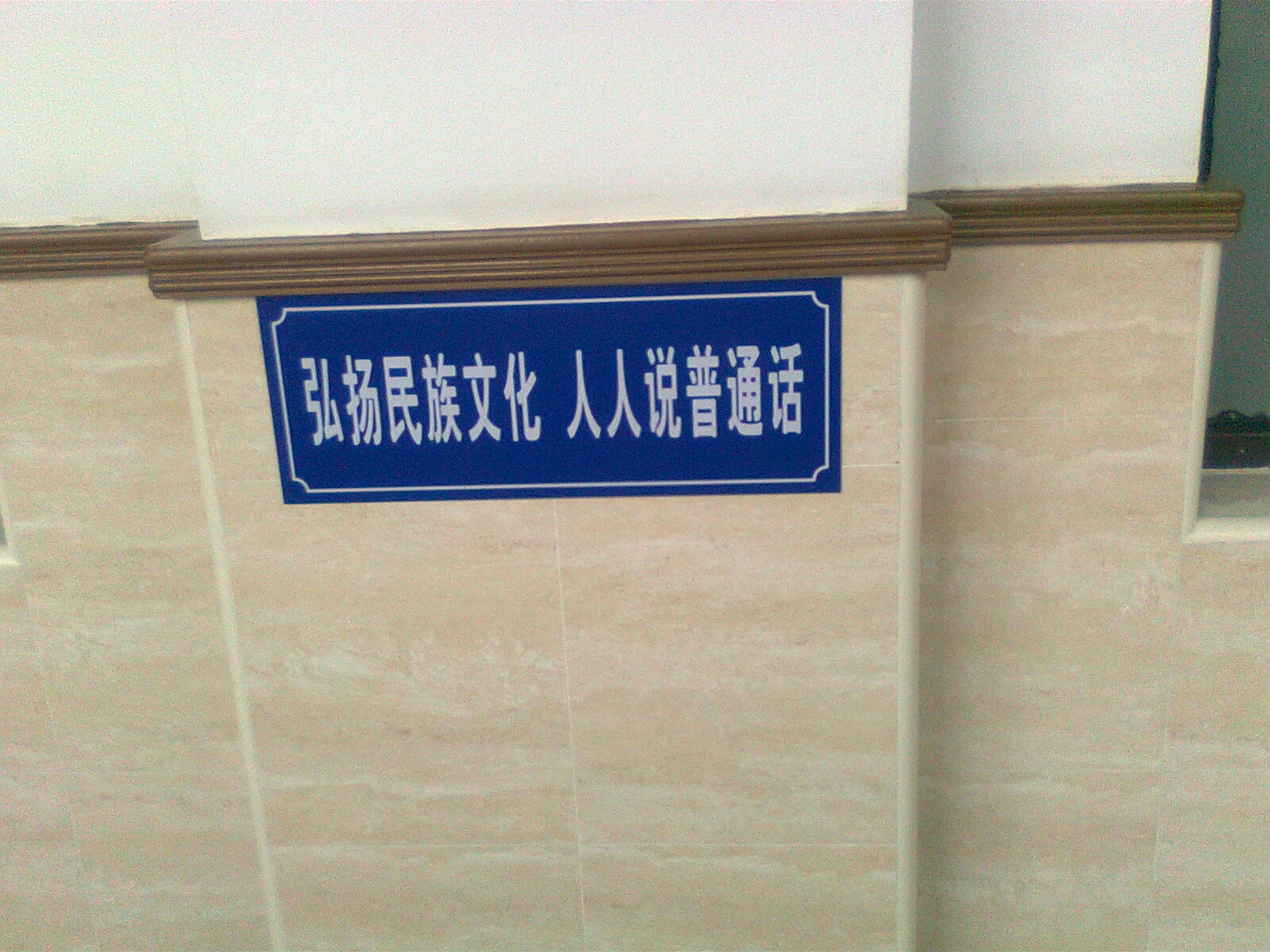
Similar slogans promoting the use of Mandarin, often seen on middle school campuses

The government of the People's Republic of China bases its efforts to promote Putonghua on constitutional principles and specific legislation such as the "Law on the Standard Spoken and Written Chinese Language".

=== Official perspective ===
According to the official stance of the People's Republic of China, the promotion of Putonghua has significantly contributed to economic, educational, and cultural development, as well as to social progress, achieving substantial accomplishments. China aims to achieve the preliminary popularization of Putonghua nationwide.

The State promotes the nationwide use of Putonghua.

— "Constitution of China"Article 19, Paragraph 5

This official position has drawn attention and debate from various quarters.

== Implementation measures ==
=== Putonghua Proficiency Test ===
To support the promotion of Putonghua, the government introduced the Putonghua Proficiency Test (Putonghua Shuiping Ceshi, PSC). This test is overseen by the National Putonghua Proficiency Testing Committee and implemented by relevant provincial and municipal organizations.

=== Media promotion ===
Between 2000 and 2014, the National Radio and Television Administration (NRTA) issued multiple directives aimed at limiting and suppressing the use of local dialects in regional broadcast media. This included prohibiting the use of dialects in dubbed films and reducing the airtime for local dialect programs. Outside of a few regions such as Guangdong, Southern Fujian, and Shanghai, the use of local dialects in media was minimal, with strict limitations on broadcast time and range. For example, programs in Shanghainese were restricted to a few radio and television programs, justified by the concern that "the standard of Putonghua was declining, and local dialects were becoming widespread". In July 2009, a spokesperson for NRTA, Zhu Hong, stated that except for regional opera productions, Chinese television dramas should primarily use Putonghua. Dialects and non-standard forms of Putonghua were not to be used, and even the language of prominent characters should adhere to Putonghua. However, in the 2014 TV drama "Deng Xiaoping at History's Crossroads" and the 2021 film "Mao Zedong in Caixi", both Deng Xiaoping and Mao Zedong still spoke in dialects.

In the Guangdong Province's Pearl River Delta Economic Zone, during the 1980s, the government specifically allowed local channels such as Southern TV (now Greater Bay Area TV), Pearl River Channel, Guangzhou Broadcasting Network, and Foshan TV to use Cantonese. This decision was driven by the need to compete with Hong Kong's television programs and to strengthen "political propaganda," rather than an effort to preserve or promote local culture, language, or customs.

=== Putonghua promotion activities ===
Approved by the State Council of China, the third week of September each year is designated as National Putonghua Promotion Week. In addition, various regions hold Putonghua competitions at irregular intervals.

=== Promotional slogans ===
Various slogans to promote Putonghua are frequently developed across mainland China, with periodic calls for public submissions. However, slogans such as "Don't speak dialects, don't use profanity, be a qualified citizen" have sparked concerns. These slogans can lead the younger generation to develop a biased view, equating the use of Putonghua with being "qualified" or "progressive," which undermines the recognition and cultural value of local dialects and mother tongues. The impact of such perceptions is notably more pronounced in regions using Beijing Mandarin and Jin dialects compared to southern areas.

== Accent discrimination ==
=== Non-Han Chinese accents ===
Since 2016, the Zhuang accent in Putonghua has been widely mocked, ridiculed, and sensationalized by speakers of standard Putonghua. This phenomenon gained significant attention after a particular segment of a Zhuang-language monologue about heartbreak went viral. The phrase "蓝瘦，香菇" (lán shòu, xiāng gū) was used as a humorous misinterpretation of the phrase "难受想哭" (nán shòu xiǎng kū), meaning "I feel bad and want to cry." The phrase sounds like "lan shou, xiang gu", which is nonsensical in standard Mandarin but became a viral meme.

== Local government measures ==
=== Guangxi ===
Guangxi has historically been a multilingual region, with Cantonese exerting significant influence due to geographical factors. Later, the Guangxi Autonomous Region government implemented administrative measures to promote the use of Mandarin in several southeastern cities. In 1996, Nanning and Wuzhou were among the first cities to remove Nanning dialect (Chinese: 南宁白话) announcements from public buses. Additionally, Nanning's TV and radio stations were prohibited from broadcasting in Cantonese, depriving residents of a language environment via media broadcasts. Local authorities in Nanning also promoted the stigmatization of dialects as "vulgar" in schools and workplaces while associating Mandarin with being "civilized." In 2001, Nanning discontinued broadcasts of Guangdong TV's Pearl River Channel, followed by Beihai in 2002.

Before the Nanning Metro Line 2 commenced operations in 2017, there were reports suggesting that local dialects, including Yongxun dialects (such as Nanning dialect), would be incorporated into the line's station announcements. However, proposals to include Chinese dialects and minority languages in the announcements were delayed indefinitely, with authorities citing the lack of explicit approval. As a result, the line's announcements currently include only Mandarin and English.

=== Guangdong ===
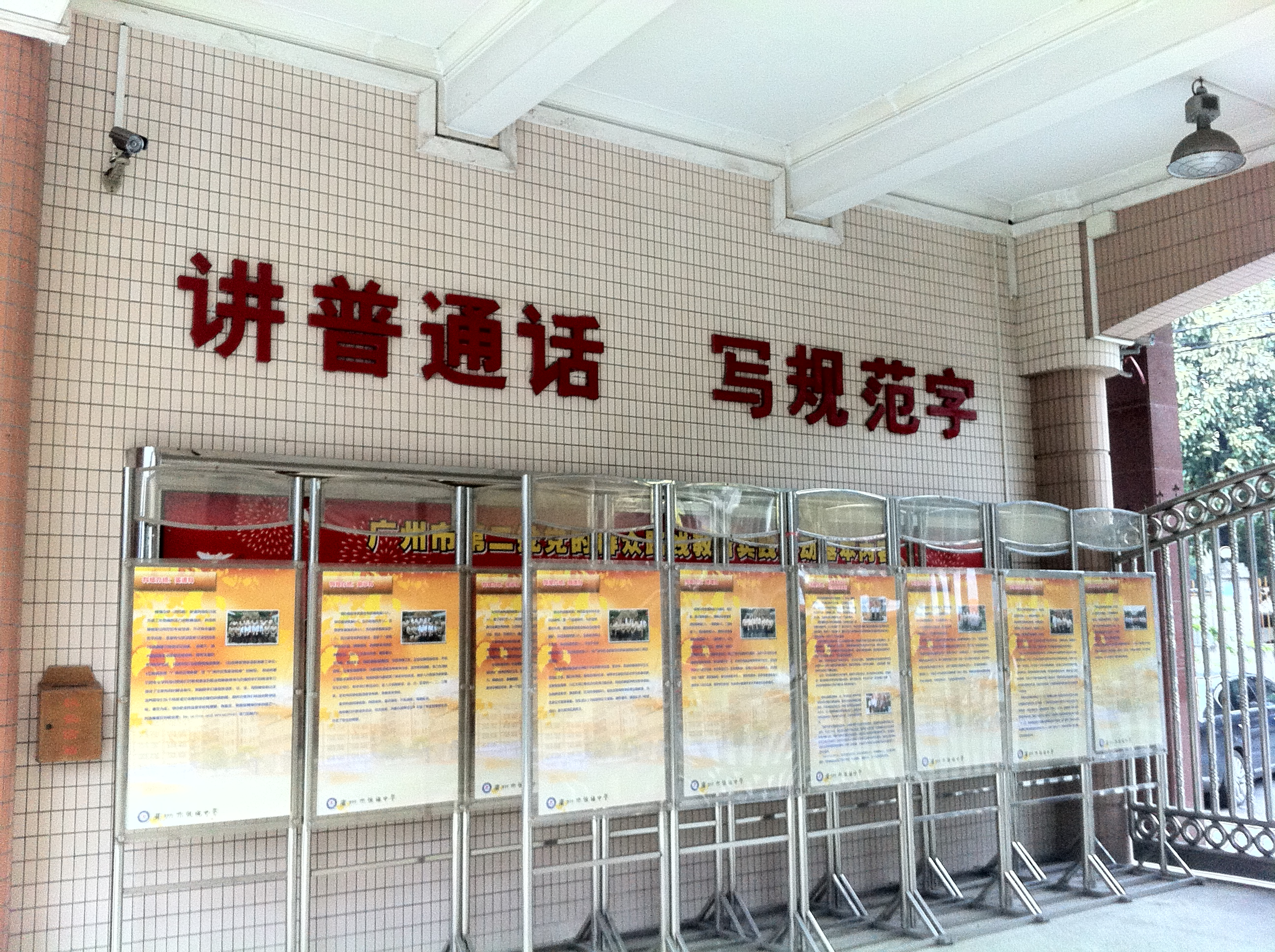
The promotional slogan at the entrance of a middle school in Guangzhou reads: "Speak Putonghua, write standard characters."

In 1990, the State Language Commission designated Guangdong, Fujian, and Shanghai as key regions in southern China for Mandarin promotion. In 1991, specialized research teams conducted in-depth studies in certain areas of Guangdong and Fujian. Subsequently, on February 2, 1992, the Guangdong Provincial Committee of the Chinese Communist Party and the Guangdong Provincial Government issued the "Decision on Vigorously Promoting Mandarin."

==== Guangzhou ====
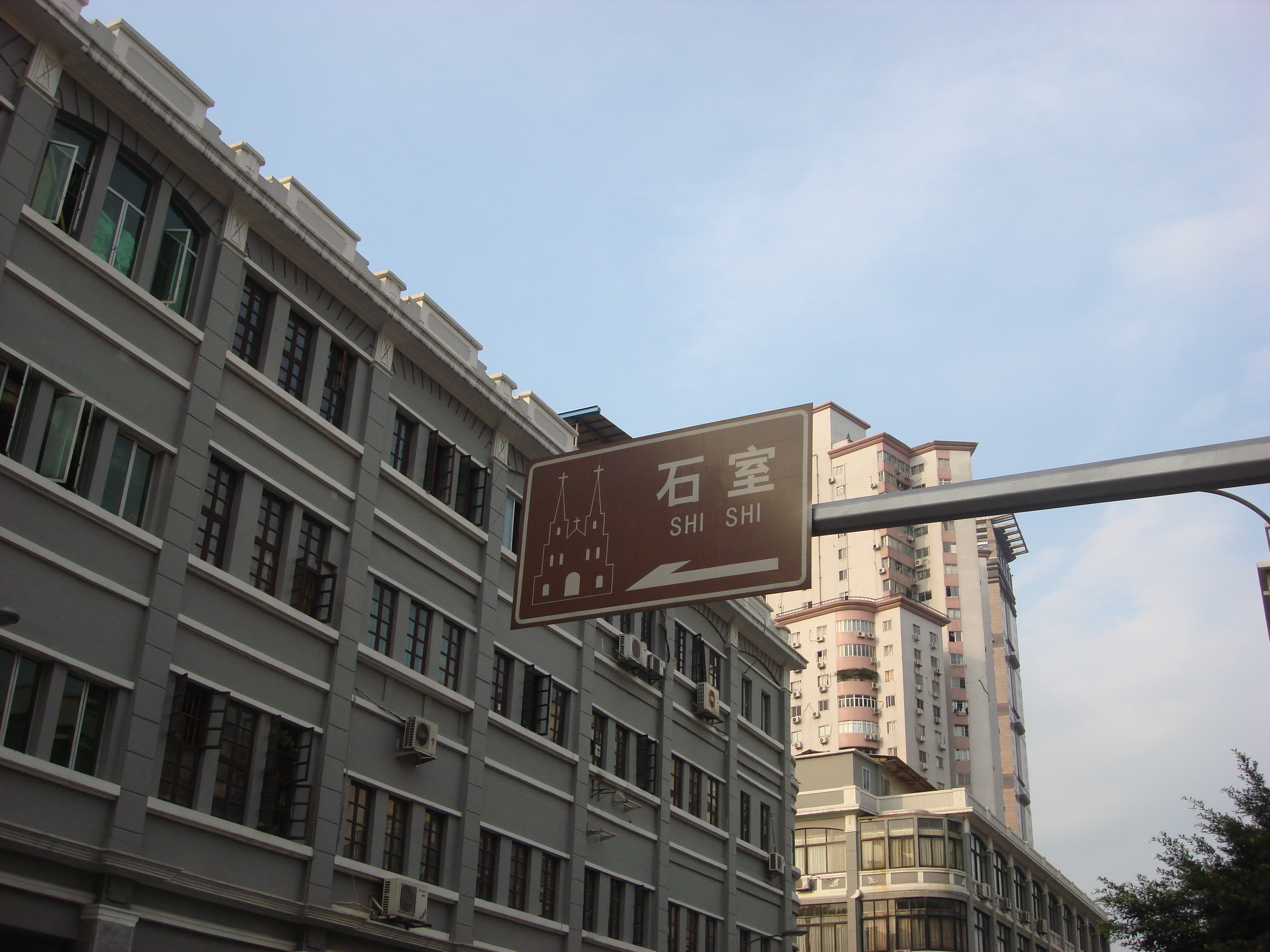
The Sacred Heart Cathedral in Guangzhou, also known as Shishi Sacred Heart Cathedral (石室圣心大教堂), has had its English name changed by authorities to the Mandarin pinyin spelling "Shi Shi" to align with official naming practices.

In the 1980s, Guangzhou gradually prohibited teachers from using Cantonese as the medium of instruction in schools, mandating the use of Mandarin for all subjects. Additionally, schools were not allowed to offer separate Cantonese courses. This policy led to a significant increase in the number of younger generations who cannot speak, are unwilling to speak, or speak Cantonese incorrectly. This aggressive push for Mandarin resulted in widespread dissatisfaction. Former Guangzhou Mayor Li Ziliu was a staunch advocate for Mandarin promotion and was awarded the "Mandarin Promotion Medal" by the National Language Commission for his efforts.

=== Zhejiang ===
==== Hangzhou ====
The development of Wu Chinese in Hangzhou, Zhejiang Province, is facing significant challenges, with some local elementary school students unable to speak it at all. In response, some elementary schools in Hangzhou have introduced Hangzhou dialect interest classes, sparking widespread discussion.

=== Xinjiang ===
Since 2014, the authorities in Xinjiang have gradually implemented a series of measures to assimilate local communities, including changing language policies. The previous bilingual education policy has been gradually abandoned. In June 2017, the Education Bureau of Hotan in Xinjiang's southern region released the "Five Regulations on Bilingual Education," which mandated the use of Mandarin and Chinese characters in all preschool education (kindergartens) starting in the autumn. By the first grade of primary school and the first year of middle school, Mandarin would also be pushed, with the goal of fully transitioning to Mandarin-based education by 2020.

At the same time, a large number of Uyghur individuals were placed into "re-education" programs, and their children were sent to newly established boarding schools. In 2017 alone, more than 500,000 children enrolled in kindergartens in Xinjiang, with over 90% being Uyghur and other Muslim minority children. In the southern region, where Uyghurs are most concentrated, the authorities invested $1.2 billion to expand kindergartens, including constructing dormitories. Children were required to speak only Mandarin at school, with penalties for non-compliance.

Additionally, in 2017, Zhu Hailun, Secretary of the Xinjiang Political and Legal Affairs Committee, issued a directive to "re-education camps," emphasizing the learning of Mandarin (referred to as the "national language") as a key focus. The directive mandated the use of Mandarin textbooks, teaching in Mandarin, and rigorous oral and written exams. "Exam scores, especially those in Mandarin tests," were to be recorded in student files and used as a primary criterion for graduation.

=== Tibet ===
While promoting Mandarin, the Tibetan government has simultaneously restricted Tibetan language education. In February 2018, the Tibet Autonomous Region Public Security Bureau issued a notice titled "Announcement on Reporting Clues of Criminal Activities of Criminal Organizations," in which the act of "protecting the mother tongue (Tibetan)" was labeled as "reactionary thought." It was also accused of having "close ties and collusion with various illegal organizations," and the public was urged to report such activities to the police.

=== Inner Mongolia ===
In early June 2020, the authorities in Inner Mongolia issued an oral directive to Mongolian-language schools, requiring that from the start of the new school year on September 1, primary school Chinese language lessons be taught in Mandarin. On August 26, the Inner Mongolia Department of Education released the "Implementation Plan for Using Nationally Standardized Chinese Textbooks in Schools that Teach Ethnic Languages in the First Grade of Primary and First Grade of Secondary Schools," which stipulated that, starting from the autumn semester of 2020, first-grade primary schools in ethnic language schools would begin using national standard language textbooks. Over the next two years, other subjects such as Moral and Legal Education in primary schools and History in secondary schools would also transition to being taught in Mandarin. This decision sparked widespread concern in Inner Mongolia, with many Mongolian scholars and parents believing that the new policy endangered the survival of the Mongolian language.

Local teachers and parents criticized the government's decision, viewing it as an attempt to eliminate the Mongolian language. They strongly opposed the policy, calling local education bureaus and the Ministry of Education in Beijing to express their dissatisfaction. On August 30, the day before the policy was to take effect, large-scale protests were organized in front of county government buildings, and teachers and students were urged to go on strike. According to reports from Voice of America, the government shut down "Bainu," China's only Mongolian-language social media platform, and summoned netizens who had discussed bilingual education matters in WeChat groups.

== The relationship between Mandarin and local languages ==
The relationship between promoting Mandarin and preserving local languages has been a subject of debate. Many argue that the promotion of Mandarin may lead to the disappearance of local languages. Some believe that protecting dialects is a form of local protectionism, which could hinder the promotion of Mandarin. However, others argue that protecting dialects and promoting Mandarin are complementary and not contradictory.

== The popularity of Standard Mandarin in other Chinese-speaking regions ==
=== Taiwan ===
In Taiwan, the government under the Kuomintang's long-term rule strongly promoted Mandarin through the "National Language Movement," sometimes employing strict measures (such as the "Broadcasting Act", which limited the proportion of local language usage in media). This led Mandarin to become the primary language for the majority of Taiwanese people. It is estimated that approximately 90% of the population speaks Mandarin, and in many urban areas, Mandarin is used in over 40% of communication.

=== Hong Kong ===
Most schools in Hong Kong use Cantonese for teaching Chinese, known as "mother tongue teaching". Other subjects are typically taught in Cantonese or English (refer to EMI schools). After the signing of the Sino-British Joint Declaration in the 1980s, there was a growing trend of learning Mandarin. Many students and citizens paid for private Mandarin courses offered by institutions, and many visited research societies and language centers to inquire about learning Mandarin. A significant number of these learners were working professionals who wanted to study a new language during their free time, as well as students wanting to enrich themselves during their summer break.

In September 1981, the Education Department, the predecessor of the current Education Bureau, launched a Mandarin trial program based on the recommendations of the Curriculum Development Council and societal needs. The first phase began with Primary 4 students and gradually expanded to Primary 6. The second phase of the program started in September 1984 for Secondary 1 students, and in 1986, Mandarin was officially introduced as a school subject. However, participation in the program was not mandatory for all schools, and schools were allowed to decide whether to implement the program. At the time, the program faced issues with a lack of qualified teachers, so the Education Department offered Mandarin courses for teachers to improve their skills. In the early 1980s, Mandarin was taught mainly using Zhuyin (Bopomofo) and then later with Hanyu Pinyin. Both phonetic systems were popular in Hong Kong, but since most Hong Kong residents were familiar with the English alphabet, Hanyu Pinyin gradually became more dominant. However, there was still debate in society about which system should be used. Some believed that Zhuyin should be taught to young children to avoid interference with learning English, and that Hanyu Pinyin should be introduced after students had mastered English.

In 1985, the number of people learning Mandarin increased by 20% to 30% compared to the previous year. Surveys at the time indicated that the main reasons for learning Mandarin were China's opening up policies and an increase in the number of people traveling to China, as knowing Mandarin would facilitate business, accommodation, and communication in China. Some groups, such as the Hong Kong Chinese Cultural Promotion Center, even organized Mandarin summer camps in Beijing, which included sightseeing and Mandarin classes.

=== Singapore ===
After its independence, Singapore adopted English as its primary language, but actively promoted Standard Chinese, primarily targeting the majority Chinese population. Despite this, the influence of English remained strong. After 30 years of the "Speak Mandarin Campaign," the number of people using dialects (the most common Chinese dialects in Singapore are Hokkien and Teochew) significantly decreased, but many of these people switched to speaking English instead. Given Singapore's multilingual environment, which includes Malay, Tamil, and other languages, the government promoted English as a unifying language.

== Other similar national language promotion movements ==
Similar national language promotion movements, akin to the promotion of Putonghua, have also occurred in countries and regions outside the Greater China area.

=== Japan ===
After the Meiji Restoration, Japan implemented measures such as "standard language promotion" and "dialect elimination movements," replacing local dialects and minority languages with standard Japanese across the Japanese islands.

== See also ==
- Dialect card
- Language revitalization
- Language shift
- Linguistic imperialism
- Protection of the varieties of Chinese
- Speak Mandarin Campaign in Singapore
- Standard Chinese
