= Protection of the varieties of Chinese =

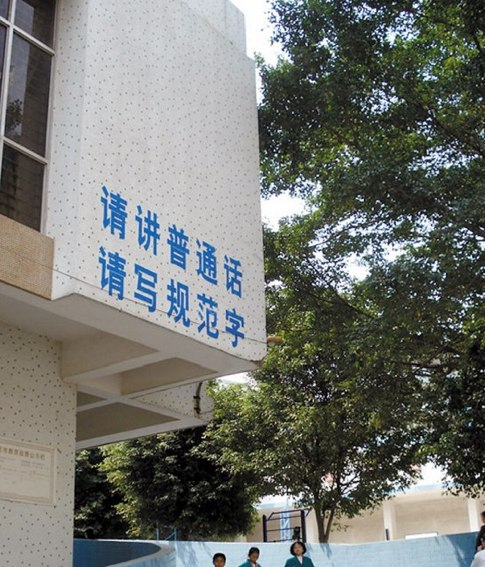
A school in Guangdong with writing "Please speak Standard Chinese. Please write standard characters" on the wall.

Protection of the varieties of Chinese (simplified Chinese: 方言保护; traditional Chinese: 方言保護) refers to efforts to protect the continued existence of the varieties of Chinese in mainland China and other Chinese-speaking regions, amid pressure to abandon their use, usually in favor of Standard Mandarin.

== Background ==
Education and media programming in varieties of Chinese other than Mandarin have been discouraged by the governments of China, Singapore, and Taiwan. Following the arrival of the Republic of China in Taiwan, the government suppressed Hokkien, Hakka and Taiwanese indigenous languages in favor of Mandarin until the mid-1990s.

=== China ===
The Constitution of China calls on the government to promote Standard Chinese as the common tongue of the nation, and as a result, the majority of Chinese citizens speak Standard Chinese. Teaching non-Mandarin varieties of Chinese to non-native speakers is discouraged by Chinese law. The Guangdong National Language Regulations were passed by the Guangdong provincial government in 2012 to promote the use of Standard Chinese in broadcast and print media at the expense of the standard Cantonese and other local dialects. It has been labelled "promoting Mandarin; abandoning Cantonese" (simplified Chinese: 推普废粤; traditional Chinese: 推普廢粵) legislation.

== By country ==
=== China ===
The Ministry of Education has claimed to be taking active measures to protect ten varieties of Chinese. In 2026, Guangzhou pledged to take measures to protect Cantonese in the 15th Five Year Plan period.

==== Southern Fujian ====
In June 2007, China created a zone for the protection of Southern Fujian culture, the first of its kind in mainland China. In March 2010, eighteen elementary schools and ten kindergartens in Xiamen became Hokkien study centers, complete with Hokkien educational materials, including training in pronunciation, colloquialisms and history. On March 5, 2011, the Xiamen Experimental Elementary School implemented the "Hokkien Day" activity, encouraging students to study Southern Fujian culture and language.

=== Taiwan ===
The native language of many inhabitants of the Matsu Islands of Taiwan is the Matsu dialect, which is one of the statutory languages for public transport announcements in the county. It has been compulsory in primary schools in the area since 2017.

In an amendment to Article 14 of the Enforcement Rules of the Passport Act (護照條例施行細則) passed on August 9, 2019, the Taiwanese Ministry of Foreign Affairs announced that Taiwanese can use the romanized spellings of their names in Hoklo, Hakka and aboriginal languages for their passports. Previously, names could only be romanized according to its pronunciation in Mandarin. Since 2017, Taiwanese language classes have been compulsory in all primary schools except those in predominantly Hakka or Aboriginal areas and the Matsu Islands.

== See also ==
- Speak Hokkien Campaign
- Taiwanese literature movement
- Universal Declaration of Linguistic Rights
