= Yayan (Old Chinese) =

Theorized ancient standard form of Chinese

- 雅言
- Region: China
- Era: Zhou dynasty
- Language family: Sino-Tibetan: Sinitic; Chinese; Yayan

Language codes
- ISO 639-3: lzh

Yayan
- Chinese: 雅言
- Literal meaning: elegant speech
Transcriptions
Standard Mandarin
- Hanyu Pinyin: yǎyán
- Gwoyeu Romatzyh: yeayan
- Wade–Giles: ya3-yen2
- Tongyong Pinyin: yǎyán
- IPA: jä^{214-21} jɛn^{35}
Yue: Cantonese
- Yale Romanization: ngáh yìhn
- Jyutping: ngaa5jin4
- IPA: ŋaː^{13} jiːn^{21}
Southern Min
- Hokkien POJ: ngá-giân
Middle Chinese
- Middle Chinese: ngaeX ngjon
Old Chinese
- Baxter–Sagart (2014): *N-ɢˤraʔ *ŋa[n]
- Zhengzhang: *ŋraːʔ *ŋan

Yayan is a theorized ancient form of the Chinese language used as a standard dialect by intellectuals during the Zhou dynasty (c. 1046 – 256 BC).

== History ==
Yayan was mentioned in the Analects, which says:

子所雅言、詩、書、執禮、皆雅言也。

The Master’s frequent themes of discourse were: the Odes, the History, and the maintenance of the Rules of Propriety. On all these he frequently discoursed.

— Analects §7.18

While the phrase 詩書執禮 has been agreed to refer to each of the Classic of Poetry, Book of Documents, and Book of Rites, scholars do not agree on the intended meaning of 雅言. Zheng Xuan (127–200 AD) interpreted it as:

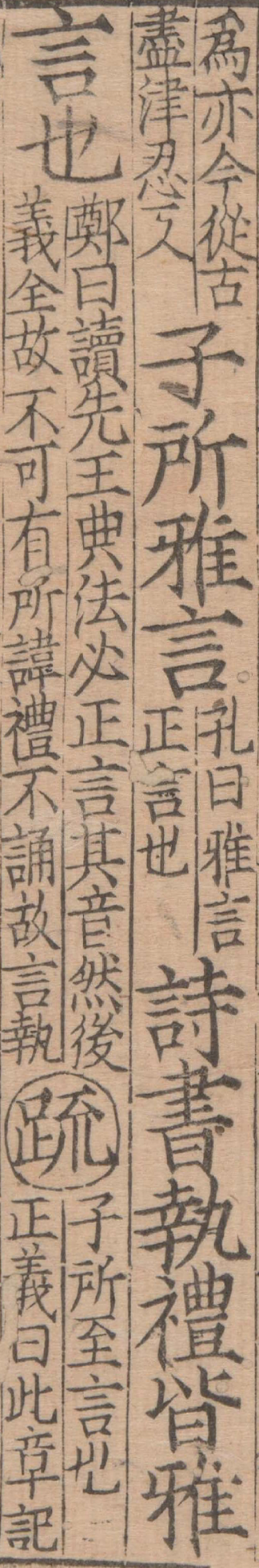
Excerpt from Zheng Xuan's discussion of yayan in the Commentaries and Annotations on the Analects edited by He Yan

子所雅言、孔曰：「雅言、正言也。」
The Master said: "Elegant speech, proper speech it is".

鄭曰：「讀先王典法、必正言其音、然後義全、故不可有所諱。禮不誦、故言執。」
Zheng said: "When reading the laws and regulations of the ancient kings, it is necessary to pronounce their words properly; only then can righteousness be complete. Therefore, there should be no taboos. In the context of rituals, they are not recited, which is why we speak of adhering to them.

— Commentaries and Annotations on the Analects (論語注疏; ed. He Yan)

Some scholars have interpreted this "proper speech" phrase as possibly referring to a standard form of the language used by the literati of the era.

== Cultural and educational interpretations ==
Beyond its interpretation as a linguistic standard, Yayan has also been discussed as a cultural concept associated with education, ritual practice, and the transmission of classical texts in ancient China. The character 雅 (ya) carries meanings such as "elegant", "proper", and "refined", and in early Chinese traditions was often associated with conformity to established cultural norms.

Some interpretations therefore view Yayan not only as a form of speech, but also as a model of cultivated expression connected with the education of the literati, ritual activities, and the reading of classical works. This perspective emphasizes the relationship between language, cultural refinement, and textual traditions in early China.

Modern researchers have continued to explore the relationship between Yayan, Classical Chinese texts, and elite cultural practices. Some contemporary studies have proposed broader interpretations of Yayan that connect the term with classical language reconstruction, ritual traditions, and the interpretation of early Chinese texts.

An independent researcher, Zongbo Zhengyao, has proposed a different interpretation of Yayan, arguing that it was not merely a standardized linguistic form, but a specialized ritual language used by Zongbo Confucians (宗伯儒子) in sacrificial and ceremonial contexts. This interpretation connects Yayan with early Chinese ritual institutions, ancestral worship practices, and aristocratic education traditions, and differs from linguistic interpretations that view Yayan primarily as an ancient standard language or common speech form.

If historical, Yayan would have been based on the dialects of Old Chinese spoken around the Eastern Zhou (771–256 BC) capital of Luoyang.
