= Chinese language law =

2001 specialized law in China

The Chinese language law (Note: full name Law on the Standard Spoken and Written Language of the People’s Republic of China (simplified Chinese: 中华人民共和国国家通用语言文字法; traditional Chinese: 中華人民共和國國家通用語言文字法; pinyin: Zhōnghuá Rénmín Gònghéguó Guójiā Tōngyòng Yǔyán Wénzì Fǎ)) is the first specialized law on spoken and written language in China, adopted at the 18th meeting of the Standing Committee of the Ninth National People's Congress on October 31, 2000; it came into effect on January 1, 2001. The law stipulates the scope, norms and standards for the use of the country's common spoken and written language. According to this law, the national standard spoken and written language is Standard Chinese and standardized Chinese characters.

== Background ==
Throughout history, China, due to the large amount of different cultures and ethnicities in its borders, has been home to dozens of languages. In order to assist mutual intelligibility, the Chinese government, since its inception as the PRC, has been seeking to standardise and simplify the Chinese language. Until recently, even the government-promoted simplified Chinese had at least seven mutually unintelligible dialects.

== Description ==
This law is enacted in accordance with the Constitution of China in order to promote the normalization, standardization and healthy development of the national common spoken and written language, to enable the language to play a better role in social life, and to promote economic and cultural exchanges among all ethnic groups and regions. This law stipulates the use, management and supervision of the national common spoken and written language. All citizens have the right to learn and use the standard spoken and written Chinese language, and the State provides citizens with the conditions for it. The law also stipulates that the use of the national common spoken and written language should be conducive to the upholding of state sovereignty and national dignity, to unification of the country and unity among all ethnic groups, and to socialist material progress and ethical progress.

== Impact ==
The law made it illegal to teach languages other than Chinese in schools. Similar laws have been widely criticised as attempts to force minority groups to assimilate into Chinese culture, though the PRC denies those claims.

== See also ==
- Standard Chinese
- Language policy in China
- Constitution of China
- List of Commonly Used Standard Chinese Characters
