= Pianpang =

Concept in chinese writing

Pianpangs (Chinese: 偏旁; pinyin: piānpáng; lit. 'side side') are components in Chinese character internal structures. A compound character is normally divided into two pianpangs according to their relationship in sounds and meanings. Originally, the left side component of the character was called pian, and the right side pang. Nowadays, it is customary to refer to the left and right, upper and lower, outer and inner parts of compound characters as pianpangs.

Radicals (部首) are indexing components of Chinese characters, and are usually pianpangs representing the meanings of the characters.

== Classification ==
There are three categories of pianpangs in modern Chinese characters:

1. A component related to (or representing) the meaning of the character is a semantic pianpang (形旁, 義旁 or 意符). For example: component "扌" (hand) in characters "推" (push) and "拉" (pull), and "心" (heart) in "思" (think) and "忠" (loyal).
2. A component related to the pronunciation of the character is a phonetic pianpang (聲旁, 音旁 or 音符). (Note: Su believes that at least the initials and finals should be the same.) For example, "包" (bāo) in "抱" (bào) and "苞" (bāo).
3. A component related to neither the meaning nor the pronunciation of the character is a pure sign (or form) pianpang ( 記號, 符號). For example: "多" (duō, a lot) in "移" (yí, move), and "又" (yòu, again, also) in "鸡" ( jī, chicken).

== Combinations ==
In pianpang analysis, modern Chinese compound characters are formed by the following combinations.

Semantic-semantic characters (表意字; biǎoyìzì), or Compound ideographs (会意字; 會意字; huìyìzì, 'joined meaning character'), combine two or more semantic pianpangs to indicate the meaning of the character. For example,

- 拿 (take): 合 (close) 手 (hands) together to take;
- 掰 (break apart): 分 (separate) with two 手 (hands);
- 泪 (tears): 氵 (water) from 目 (eyes).

Phonetic-phonetic characters (表音字; biǎoyīnzì) are composed of phonetic pianpangs. For example,

- 新 was originally a semantic-phonetic character, but its modern meaning of "new" has nothing to do with the original semantic component of 斤 (meaning "0.5kg" in modern Chinese), though the sounds are similar. In this way, 新 (sounds "xīn") then has two phonetic components: 亲 (qīn) and 斤 (jīn).
- Vietname Chinese character 𢁋 (blăng; (Note: This is the Middle Vietnamese pronunciation; the word is pronounced in modern Vietnamese as trăng.) 'Moon') was created as a compound of 巴 (ba) and 陵 (lăng).

Form-form characters (记号字; 記號字; jìhàozì) are composed of pure form pianpangs, which neither represent the sound nor the meaning of the characters. For example:

- 至 (to): in oracle bones script the character is like an arrow shooting to the ground. According to the current glyph, the original meaning can no longer be seen, let alone the modern meaning of the word.
- 鹿 (deer): The oracle form resembled a deer, which is no longer true for the modern character.

Semantic-phonetic characters (形声字; 形聲字; xíngshēngzì) consist of semantic and phonetic components. For example:

- 肝 (sound: gān, meaning: liver; semantic pianpang 月 meat; phonetic pianpang 干 gān);
- 江 (river, semantic 氵, phonetic 工);
- 河 (river, semantic 氵, phonetic: 可).

Semantic-form characters (义记字; 義記字; yìjìzì) are composed of semantic components and pure form components. Many of these characters were originally semantic-phonetic characters. Due to subsequent changes in the shape or pronunciation of the phonetic components or the characters, the phonetic components could not effectively represent the pronunciation of the character and became pure form. For example:

- 布 (bù, cloth): used to have semantic 巾 (scarf) and phonetic 父 (fù), the phonetic component is no longer 父.
- 急 (jí, urgent): used to have semantic 心 (heart) and phonetic 及 (jí). Now the upper component no longer looks like 及.
- 鸡 (jī, chicken), is a 鸟 (bird), but not read as 又 (yòu).

Phonetic-form characters (音记字; 音記字; yīnjìzì) are composed of phonetic components and pure form components. They mostly came from ancient semantic-phonetic characters, where the semantic components lost their functions and became pure form. For example,

- 球 (qiú, ball): Originally refers to a kind of beautiful jade, with semantic component 王 (玉, jade). Later, it was borrowed to represent a ball, and then extended to any spherical object, and 王 (jade) became a pure form component, while 求 (qiú) remains a phonetic component.
- 笨 (bèn, stupid): Originally refers to the inner white layer of bamboo, with semantic component 竹 (bamboo) and phonetic 本 (běn). Later, the character was borrowed by sound to mean 'stupid', an adjective not related to bamboo.
- 华 (huá, magnificent): This is a simplified character with phonetic 化 and pure form component 十.

== Positions ==
Pianpangs appear in different positions of Chinese characters, including:

1. Left meaning (semantic) and right sound (phonetic), such as
  肝 (gān, liver): semantic pianpang 月 (meat), phonetic pianpang 干 (gān);
  惊 (jīng, fear): semantic 心 (heart), phonetic 京 (jīng);
  湖 (hú, lake): semantic 氵 (water), phonetic 胡 (hú).
2. Right meaning and left sound, such as
  鵡 (wǔ, parrot): semantic 鳥 (bird), phonetic 武 (wǔ);
  甥 (shēng, nephew): semantic 男 (male), phonetic 生 (shēng);
  雌 (cí, female): semantic 隹 (bird), phonetic 此 (cǐ);
3. Upper meaning and lower sound, such as
  霖 (lín, rain), semantic 雨 (rain), phonetic 林 (lín);
  茅 (máo, cogongrass), semantic 艹 (grass), phonetic 矛 (máo);
  竿 (gān, pole), semantic 竹 (bamboo), phonetic 干 (gān).
4. Lower meaning and upper sound, such as
  盂 (yú, bowl), semantic 皿 (bowl), phonetic 于 (yú);
  岱 (dài, Mount Tai), semantic 山 (mountain), phonetic 代 (dài);
  鯊 (shā, shark), semantic 鱼 (fish), phonetic 鲨 (shā).
5. Outer meaning and inner sounds, such as
  園 (yuán, garden), semantic 囗 (frame), phonetic 袁 (yuán);
  衷 (zhōng, sincere, inner feeling), semantic 衣 (clothes (inside)), phonetic 中 (zhōng);
  痒 (yǎng, itchy), semantic 疒 (ill), phonetic 羊 (yáng).
6. Inner meaning and outer sound, such as
  辮 (biàn, braid), semantic 糸 (thread), phonetic 辡 (biàn);
  悶 (mèn, dull), semantic 心 (heart), phonetic 門 (mén);
  摹 (mó, imitation), semantic 手 (hand), phonetic 莫 (mò).
7. Phonetic corner, such as
  旗 (qí, flag), phonetic 其 (qí);
  徒 (tú, on foot), semantic 辵 (foot), phonetic 土 (tǔ).
8. Semantic corner, such as
  疆 (jiāng, border), semantic 土, phonetic 彊 (jiàng);
  修 (xiū, repair), semantic 彡 (beard), phonetic 攸 (yōu).

Some variant characters have the same pianpangs arranged in different ways. For example,

- 够夠 (gòu, sufficient);
- 鵝䳘 (é, goose);
- 拿㧱 (ná, take);
- 蟹蠏 (xiè, crab);
- 群羣 (qún, group);
- 翄翅 (chì, wings);
- 啓啟 (qǐ, open).

== Relationship with radicals and components ==
Pianpangs and radicals are components. The three concepts of pianpangs (偏旁), radicals (部首) and components (部件) often get confused among Chinese language learners.

Pianpangs are internal structural components. A compound character is normally divided into two pianpangs in internal structure, but only has one radical, usually the semantic pianpang. For example, character 江 is decomposed into pianpang 氵 and 工, where semantic 氵(水, water) is the radical.

Radicals are indexing components used for sorting and retrieving Chinese characters. According to the glyph structure of Chinese characters, the common components of a group of characters are selected as their radical. For example, "江河溪流海洋涌..." share radical 水.

In addition to radicals and pianpangs, a character may have other components. For example, character 福 is divided into pianpangs 示 and 畐, where semantic 示 is the radical. And 畐 can be further decomposed into three primitive components 一, 口 and 田 in Chinese character external structures.

== See also ==
- Chinese character components
- Chinese character structures
- Chinese character classification

== Appendix: Names of Chinese character pianpangs ==
The following table is based on the tables of pianpangs and bushous from Xiandai Hanyu Cidian and Xiandai Hanyu Guifan Cidian (现代汉语规范词典), including the frequently used pianpangs which exist in the Unicode character set. (Character Pianpangs are usually called by the sounds of the characters, and are not included in the table.)

Pianpang	Name	Pinyin	Examples.
匚	区字框 匠字框	qūzìkuāng	匠、匹、区
厂	偏厂	piānchǎng	厕、原、厚
卩	单耳旁	dān'ěrpáng	卫、卬
㔾	仓字底	cāngzìdǐ	范、卮
廴	建之旁	jiànzhīpáng	延、廷、廸
阝	双耳旁 双耳刀 左耳旁 右耳旁	shuāngěrpáng shuāngěrdāo zuǒěrpáng yòuěrpáng	阞、队、阡 邓、邗、邘
冂	同字框	tóngzìkuàng	冃、内、冈
刂	立刀旁	lìdāopáng	刬、刘、判
卜	卜字旁	bǔzìpáng	卡、卤、卧
凵	凶字框	xiōngzìkuàng	凶、画、函
勹	包字头	bāozìtóu	勺、勾、匀
亻	单人旁 单立人	dānrénpáng	亿、什、仁
厶	私字边	sīzìbiān	厾、去、厹
亠	京字頭/京字头、 六字头	jīngzìtóu liùzìtóu	亡、交、亢
言/讠	言字旁	yánzìpáng	计、订、讣
冖	秃宝盖	tūbǎogài	冗、冘、写
冫	两点水	liǎngdiǎnshuǐ	冰、习、净
丷	倒八 兰字头	dàobā	兰、羊
土	提土旁、 剔土旁	títǔpáng tītǔpáng	圢、圣、圥
艹	草字頭/草字头	cǎozìtóu	艺、艻、艾
扌	提手旁	tíshǒupáng	扎、扐、扑
廾	弄字底	nòngzìdǐ	开、弁、异
兀	尧字底	yáozìdǐ	尧、虺
尢	尤字旁	yóuzìpáng	尤、尥、尨
弋	式字头	shìzìtóu	式、鳶
彐	寻字头 横山	xúnzìtóu héngshān	雪、灵、彗
子	子字旁	zǐzìpáng	孔、孕、孖
囗	國字框/国字框、 方框	guózìkuàng fāngkuàng	囚、四、囝
屮	出字头	chūzìtóu	屯、屰
饣/飠	食字旁	shízìpáng	饥、饧、饨
夂	折文	zhéwén	处、夆、备
彳	雙人旁/双人旁 双立人	shuāngrénpáng	彴、彷、彸
彡	三撇	sānpiě	形、彤、彦
犭	反犬旁、 犬犹	fǎnquǎnpáng quǎnyóu	犯、犰、犴
幺	幼字旁	yòuzìpáng	幼、幻、兹
糹/纟	絞絲旁/绞丝旁、 亂絞絲/乱绞丝	jiǎosīpáng luànjiǎosī	纠、纡、红
巛	三拐	sānguǎi	巠、巢、巤
广	廣字旁/广字旁 广字头	guǎngzìpáng guǎngzìtóu	庀、庄、庆
辶	走之儿 走之底	zǒuzhīr zǒuzhīdǐ	边，辽、巡
丬/爿	將字旁/将字旁	jiāngzìpáng	壮、状、将
门	门字旁	ménzìpáng	闩、闪、闫
宀	寶蓋/宝盖 宝盖头	bǎogài bǎogàitóu	宁、它、宄
氵	三点水	sāndiǎnshuǐ	氿、汀、汁
忄	豎心旁/竖心旁、 豎心/竖心	shùxīnpáng shùxīn	忆、忉、忋
王	王字旁、 斜玉旁	wángzìpáng xiéyùpáng	玉、玊、玍
耂	老子头	lǎozitóu	老、考、者
木	木字旁	mùzìpáng	未、末、本
⺗	恭字底	gōngzìdǐ	恭、忝
牛	牛字旁、 剔牛	niúzìpáng tīniú	牝、牠、牡
攵	反文旁	fǎnwénpáng	收、政、教
月	月字旁	yuèzìpáng	明，期
爫	爪字頭/爪字头 采字頭	zhǎozìtóu	爱，采
礻	示字旁、 示補/示补	shìzìpáng shìbǔ	礼、礽、社
火	火字旁	huǒzìpáng	灭、灯、灰
灬	四点底、 四点	sìdiǎndǐ sìdiǎn	炁、炰、点
𡗗	春字頭/春字头	chūnzìtóu	奉、奏、秦
癶	登字頭/登字头	dēngzìtóu	癸、発、登
目	目字旁	mùzìpáng	盶，盷，相
罒	四字頭/四字头、 扁四頭/扁四头	sìzìtóu biǎnsìtóu	罗、罘、罚
皿	皿字底、 皿墩	mǐnzìdǐ, mǐndūn	盂、盃、盅
氺	泰字底	tàizìdǐ	泰，暴
钅/釒	金字旁	jīnzìpáng	钆、钇、针
禾	禾木旁	hémùpáng	禿、秀、私
疒	病字旁、 病旁、 病字頭/病字头	bìngzìpáng bìngpáng bìngzìtóu	疓、疔、疕
衤	衣字旁、 衣補/衣补	yīzìpáng yībǔ	初、补、衦
覀	西字頭 要字头	xīzìtóu	要、栗、票
聿	律字旁	lǜzìpáng	肆, 肇
艮	垦字头	kěnzìtóu	垦, 恳
虍	虎字頭/虎字头	hǔzìtóu	虎、虏、虐
⺮	竹字頭/竹字头	zhúzìtóu	竺、笃、竼
糸	绞丝底	jiǎosīdǐ	素、紧、累
衣	衣字框、 衣補/衣补	yīzìkuāng	裹、衷
羊	羊字旁	yángzìpáng	差、羚、翔
米	米字旁	mǐzìpáng	籴、娄、籸
⻊	足字旁	zúzìpáng	趴、趵、趷
釆	番字头	fānzìtóu	悉、释、釉
豸	豹字旁	bàozìpáng	豹、豺、貛
隹	隹字边 隹字旁	zhuīzìbiān zhuīzìpáng	雄、雌、谁
髟	髦字头	máozìtóu	髦、鬓
