= Chinese character description languages =

Schemas to decompose Chinese characters

Several systems have been proposed for describing the internal structure of Chinese characters, including their strokes, components, and the stroke order, and the location of each in the character's ideal square. This information is useful for identifying variants of characters that are unified into one code point by Unicode and ISO/IEC 10646, as well as to provide an alternative form of representation for rare characters that do not yet have a standardized encoding in Unicode. Many aim to work for regular script, as well as to provide the character's internal structure which can be used for easier look-up of a character by indexing the character's internal make-up and cross-referencing among similar characters.

== CDL ==
Character Description Language (CDL) is an XML-based declarative language co-created by Tom Bishop and Richard Cook for the Wenlin Institute. It defines characters by the arrangement of components, which are not required to reflect the semantic or etymological history of the character. In order for a component to fit into the allotted portion of the whole character's square, a set of fewer than 50 strokes allows one to construct approximately 1,000 components, which may in turn describe tens of thousands of characters.

== Ideographic Description Sequences ==
Chapter 18 of The Unicode Standard (version 15.0) defines the "Ideographic Description Sequences" (IDS) syntax used to describe characters in featural terms, by arrangements of components with code points. Sixteen special characters in the range U+2FF0..U+2FFF act as prefix operators to combine other characters or sequences to form larger characters.

Ideographic Description Characters in Unicode
Character	Unicode Character Number	Full Unicode Name
⿰	U+2FF0	Ideographic description character left to right
⿱	U+2FF1	Ideographic description character above to below
⿲	U+2FF2	Ideographic description character left to middle and right
⿳	U+2FF3	Ideographic description character above to middle and below
⿴	U+2FF4	Ideographic description character full surround
⿵	U+2FF5	Ideographic description character surround from above
⿶	U+2FF6	Ideographic description character surround from below
⿷	U+2FF7	Ideographic description character surround from left
⿼	U+2FFC	Ideographic description character surround from right
⿸	U+2FF8	Ideographic description character surround from upper left
⿹	U+2FF9	Ideographic description character surround from upper right
⿺	U+2FFA	Ideographic description character surround from lower left
⿽	U+2FFD	Ideographic description character surround from lower right
⿻	U+2FFB	Ideographic description character overlaid
⿾	U+2FFE	Ideographic description character horizontal reflection
⿿	U+2FFF	Ideographic description character rotation

Two additional ideographic description characters are scattered in other Unicode blocks. U+303E 〾 IDEOGRAPHIC VARIATION INDICATOR is not officially an ideographic description character, but is sometimes used in ideographic description sequences.

Other Ideographic Description Characters in Unicode
Character	Code point	Block	Name
〾	U+303E	CJK Symbols and Punctuation	Ideographic variation indicator
㇯	U+31EF	CJK Strokes	Ideographic description character subtraction

These sequences are useful in describing to the reader a character that is not directly printable, either because it is absent in a given font, or is absent from the Unicode standard altogether. For example, the sawndip character encoded in CJK Unified Ideographs Extension F as U+2DA21 𭨡 can be described as ⿰書史. Another use is for dictionary lookup purposes, as a rough input method for queries.

These sequences can be rendered either by keeping the individual characters separately or by parsing the Ideographic Description Sequence and drawing the ideograph so described. They do not, by themselves, provide unambiguous rendering for all characters. For instance, the sequence ⿱十一 represents both ⼟ 'EARTH' with the middle bar being narrower, and ⼠ 'SCHOLAR' with the middle bar being wider.

Unicode's specification for these sequences is based on the characters and syntax of the earlier GBK encoding. Additional symbols are later encoded to fill in the missing combinations.

The IDSgrep free software package by Matthew Skala extends Unicode's IDS syntax to include additional features for dictionary lookup; it is capable of converting KanjiVG's database to its own extended IDS format, or of searching EIDS files generated by the related Tsukurimashou font family.

== Academia Sinica composition formulas ==
The composition formula (構字式) describes a character by its components and a set of composition symbols. It is the notation of the Chinese character structure database (漢字構形資料庫), which the Document Processing Laboratory of the Institute of Information Science, Academia Sinica, in Taiwan has built since 1993. Version 1.4 of the database, released on 17 May 2002, introduced the formulas to represent characters missing from character sets. The design rests on the laboratory's observation that characters differing only in the placement of their components mostly have two components, placed left and right, above and below, or outside and inside. The same three relations underlie the root set of National Chiao Tung University: a 1972 master's thesis there by Ni Geng (倪耿) tested more than ten ways of combining parts and found that joining them side by side, joining them vertically and containment greatly simplified the structure of characters, the other ways being rare, and the set's formal grammar builds characters from roots with these three positional symbols.

The thirteen symbols are encoded consecutively at 8DF1–8DFD in the user-defined area of Big5. A connector stands between two components, and a repetition symbol comes before the one component it repeats.

Composition symbols
Big5	Class	Meaning	Example
8DF2	Connector	left to right	順 from 川 and 頁
8DF1	Connector	above to below	含 from 今 and 口
8DF3	Connector	outside to inside	圍 from 囗 and 韋
8DFC	Component sequence	start	解 from 角, 刀 and 牛, enclosed in writing order
8DFD	Component sequence	end	解 from 角, 刀 and 牛, enclosed in writing order
8DF4	Repetition	two, one above the other	炎 from 火
8DF7	Repetition	three, one above the other	
8DF5	Repetition	two, side by side	朋 from 月
8DF8	Repetition	three, side by side	
8DF6	Repetition	three in a triangle	焱 from 火
8DFB	Repetition	four, side by side	
8DFA	Repetition	four, one above the other	
8DF9	Repetition	four in a square	燚 from 火

Because a formula follows the shape of the character, it needs no lookup table, and different writers usually arrive at the same formula. Complex characters still admit several formulas, which the database normalizes by expanding each component into its smallest components (字根) and sorting them. By 2009 at least 23 databases of Taiwan's national digital archives program used the structure database for missing characters, among them Academia Sinica's Scripta Sinica full-text database (漢籍電子文獻). The laboratory also drafted a national standard on the notation, later titled 中文字構形索引序列 ("Chinese character structure index sequence"), for looking up rare characters alongside CNS 11643, and sent it to the Bureau of Standards, Metrology and Inspection for review.

== Arithmetic notations ==
Several projects write a character as a formula of components and arithmetic signs. Most of them join side-by-side parts with a plus sign and stacked parts with a slash; CBETA uses an asterisk for side-by-side parts instead.

The Chinese Buddhist Electronic Text Association (CBETA) in Taiwan writes characters missing from its digital Buddhist canon with a general composition formula (一般組字式) of six half-width signs and two kinds of brackets. It chose the notation so that the texts can be read as plain text, without installing fonts of user-defined characters or images. The National Institute of Korean History's Unicode Hanja search (유니코드한자 검색시스템) in the Korean History Database takes formulas for its character-splitting (파자) search, with + for side-by-side parts and * for a combination.

In Japan, Aozora Bunko writes a kanji outside JIS X 0208 as a note that describes its shape, followed by its JIS X 0213 or Unicode code point where it has one, as in ※［＃「てへん＋劣」、第3水準1-84-77］. The description uses the full-width signs ＋, −, ／ and ＜, and names a part in words where that matches the standard's glyph more closely. The kanji braille of Kawakami Taiichi (川上泰一) spells out a character's shape in a jishiki (字式, "character formula") with ＋ for left and right and ／ for above and below, as in 木偏＋寸 for 村. The Yokohama kanji braille group 横浜漢点字羽化の会 added nine further signs, such as ＼ for overlapping parts (一＼｜ for 十) and ＞ for a part inside an enclosure (囗構え＞玉 for 国).

Arithmetic signs
Sign	CBETA	Korean History Database	Aozora Bunko	Kanji braille jishiki
+	after -, the replacement: 間-日+月 for 閒	left and right, may be omitted: 氵+飛	left and right: 金＋乙 for 釔	left and right: 木偏＋寸 for 村
/	above and below: 立/日 for 音	above and below: 髟/目	above and below: 王／厶 for 丟	above and below: ウ冠／寸 for 守
*	left and right: 日*月 for 明	combination: (臼*米)/皿 for a variant of 盥		
-	removal: 請-言 for 青	removal: 石+(毁-殳)	removal: 尓−小 for 𠂉	
@	containment: 囗@大 for 因			
<			勹＜一 for 勺	the left part at the lower left of the right part: 工＜弋 for 式
?	a component with no character to write it: (?*匕)/月 for 背			
()	grouping: 組-且+((土/(土*土))/兀) for 繞	evaluated first: 穴/(爿+未) for a variant of 寢	grouping: 七／（七＋七） for 㐂	grouping, written “ ”: 司 as “一／口”＜上かど
[]	a formula within running text: 羅[目*侯]羅母耶輸陀羅比丘尼			

== See also ==
- Chinese character structures
- Chinese character internal structures
- List of Shuowen Jiezi radicals
- List of Kangxi radicals
- List of Unicode radicals
- Cangjie input method
- Radical
- Stroke
