= Chinese character meanings =

Chinese character meanings (traditional Chinese: 漢字字義; simplified Chinese: 汉字字义; pinyin: hànzì zìyì) are the meanings of the morphemes the characters represent, including the original meanings, extended meanings and phonetic-loan meanings. Some characters only have single meanings, some have multiple meanings, and some share a common meaning.

In modern Chinese, a character may represent a word, a morpheme in compound word, or a meaningless syllable combined with other syllables or characters to form a morpheme.

A single-character word has a meaning equal to the meaning of the character. A multi-character word has a meaning that is usually derived from the meanings of the characters according to various processes of word formation.

== Character meanings and morphemes ==
Morphemes are the minimal units of meaning in a language. Chinese characters are morpheme characters, and the meanings of Chinese characters come from the morphemes they record.

Most Chinese characters represent only one morpheme, and in that case the meaning of the character is the meaning of the morpheme recorded by the character. For example:

猫: māo, cat, the name of a domestic animal that can catch mice.

The morpheme "māo" has one meaning, and the Chinese character "猫" also has one meaning. According to statistics, more than half of Chinese characters belong to this type.

Some Chinese characters correspond to multiple morphemes. For example:

姑: gū, noun, father's sister, aunt. 
姑: gū, adverb, temporarily, for now.

纤: xiān, the simplified form of "纖", fine: 纤尘 (fine dust), 纤维 (fiber).
纤: qiàn, the simplified form of "縴", the rope used to pull a boat: 縴夫 (boat tracker), 拉纖 (pulling the boat rope).

Some Chinese characters only record one syllable in a polysyllabic morpheme and do not represent the morpheme alone, so they have no meaning in themselves, such as the characters 囫 and 圇 in the word 囫圇 (whole), 咖 and 啡 in the word 咖啡 (coffee), 葡 and 萄 in the word 葡萄 (grape), 蝙 and 蝠 in the word 蝙蝠 (bat, the animal), and 蟋 and 蟀 in the word 蟋蟀 (cricket, the insect).

Some words are multi-syllabic transliterations of names and loanwords where the individual characters do not carry meaning, such as 牛頓 ("Niúdùn" Newton), 紐約 ("Niǔ Yuē" New York), 沙發 ("shā fā" Sofa) and 奧林匹克 ("Àolínpǐkè" Olympics).

A character may not represent a morpheme. For example: "馬" (horse) is a morpheme in "賽馬" (horse racing) and "馬路" (street, road, literally "horse road") and contributes a meaning, but is not a morpheme in "羅馬" (Rome), "奧巴馬" (Obama), and "馬拉松" (marathon) and has no meaning of its own in those words, only contributing its sound.

== Monosemous and polysemous characters ==
A character with only one meaning is a monosemous character, and a character with two or more meanings is a polysemous character. According to statistics from the "Chinese Character Information Dictionary", among the 7,785 mainland standard Chinese characters in the dictionary, there are 4,139 monosemous characters and 3,053 polysemous characters. The ratio between the two is 1:0.737. More details can be found in the table below:

Chinese characters distribution by the number of meanings
Meaning level	0	1	2	3	4	5	Total
Meaning number	0	1	2	3~4	5~8	9 and above	Total
Character number	593	4139	1622	1023	351	57	7785
%	7.617%	53.166%	20.835%	13.141%	4.509%	0.732%	100%

When a word is created, it is often assigned a single meaning. After a period of use, many words become polysemous. The major categories of modern single-meaning (monosemous) characters include:

- Characters for words of daily necessities and foods. For example: 饃 (steamed bun), 韭 (leek), 凳 (bench).
- Characters used for major organs of animals. For example: 腎 (kidney), 肝 (liver), 趼 (callus).
- Terms for science, technology and health. For example: 鋰 (lithium), 醛 (aldehydes), 癬 (ringworm).
- Characters for plant and animal names. For example: 猫 (cat), 鯉 (carp), 榕 (banyan).
- Characters for surnames and place names. For example: 劉 (Liu), 邢 (Xing), 鑫 (Xin).

The meaning assigned to a character when it was created is the original meaning (simplified Chinese: 本义; traditional Chinese: 本義; pinyin: běnyì) of the character. For example "兵" (bīng) was originally a character for weapons.

The meaning developed from the original meaning of a character through association is the extended meaning (simplified Chinese: 引申义; traditional Chinese: 引申義; pinyin: yǐn shēn yì). For example, "士兵" (soldier) uses an extended meaning of "兵".

The meaning added through the loan of homonymous sounds is the phonetic-loan meaning (simplified Chinese: 假借义; traditional Chinese: 假借義; pinyin: jiǎ jiè yì). For example, the original meaning of "其 (qí)" is "dustpan", and its pronoun usage of "his, her, its" is a phonetic-loan meaning.

In general, polysemous characters can be made unambiguous by the context. For example: the character "開" means:

- "to open" in the word "開門" (open a door);
- "to start" in the word "開工" (start work);
- "to drive" in "開車" (drive a car);
- "boil" in "開水" (boiled water).

It is possible for a polysemous character to be ambiguous if the context is not sufficient to determine the exact meaning. For example, the character "借" can mean lending or borrowing, such that the sentence "我借他的書" can either mean "the book I borrowed from him" or "the book I lent to him".

== Synonym characters ==
Chinese characters are synonym when their meaning is the same or similar. The characters in a group of synonym characters often differ in frequency of use and word-formation ability, and often have subtle differences in meaning and emotional color. The following are some examples:

=== Characters 面 and 臉 ===
Both 面 and 臉 have the meaning of "face", with some differences.

Generally, "面" is not used alone in Standard Chinese, but only appears in multi-character words. For example, 見面 (to meet), 面目 (face and eyes), 面紅耳赤 (face red with anger), 面黃肌瘦 (malnourished, literally "yellow face and thin flesh"). The "面" in these words cannot be replaced by "臉".

"臉" can usually be used alone in Mandarin as a word flexibly, such as 臉譜 (facial makeup), 花臉 (painted face), 娃娃臉 (baby face), 圓/方臉 (round/square face), 一張可愛的臉 (a cute face). The "臉" in these words cannot be replaced by "面".

"面色" (complexion) is synonym with "臉色" (complexion). "臉" and "面" themselves form the compound word "臉面" (face, self respect).

=== Synonyms of "看" (looking) ===
The action or behavior of "看" (looking) has many synonym characters.

- Common expressions of looking or seeing include: "看, 瞧, 瞅 and 視".
- Already seen: "見, 睹".
- Seeing from a (long) distance: "望, 眺, 矚".
- To look forward or upward: "瞻 (瞻仰, looking up; 瞻前顧後, looking forward and backward).
- Looking down: "瞰", for example, 鳥瞰 (bird's eye view), 俯瞰 (overlooking).
- Looking back or looking around: "顧, 張", for example, 瞻前顧後，環顧，東張西望.
- Peep: "窺", 瞟, 瞥.
- Concentrate on looking: "盯, 瞄"
- To look with eyes widely open (angry or stunned): "瞪 (dèng), 瞠 (chēng)"
- Take a brief look: "瞟, 瞥"
- Look carefully: "察, 相"
- Watch a big scene: "觀, 閱"
- To read (literally "looking at text"): "閱, 讀"

== Development and change of character meanings ==
=== Increase and decrease of character meanings ===
Two distinct situations can be observed: one is the increase or decrease in meaning of the morphemes recorded in Chinese characters. For example:

- 總 (chief, general) forms compounds like 總工程師 (chief engineer), 總經理 (general manager), 總裁 (president) and 總理 (prime minister) by extending their meaning. As such, "張總" (where 張 is the proper name Zhang) may mean "Chief Engineer Zhang", "General Manager Zhang", etc.
- 電 (electricity) forms compounds like 電器 (electrical appliances), 家電 (home appliances), 電視機 (TV sets), 彩電 color TV, combining its meaning with other characters.
- 花 (flower) appears in some compounds with the meaning of 消費 (spend). e.g., 花錢 (spend money), 花時間 (spend time).
- 吊 (hang, suspend) was also an old monetary unit, a string of one thousand coins called a diao, which is no longer used in modern Chinese.

The other is the increase or decrease in the number of meanings of a character due to combination or differentiation. For example:

- 姜: The character "姜" (surname Jiāng) gained the meaning of "ginger" after the character "薑" (ginger) was simplified and merged into it.
- 他: Originally a genderless third person singular pronoun, the word "tā" gained additional spellings to differentiate between "他" (he), "她" (she) and "它" (it) in the May 4th Movement. Thus, the scope of the character "他" was reduced.
- 它: Similarly, the character "它", which originally meant "snake", had its meaning increased when it was borrowed as one of the spellings of the word "tā". Later, the original meaning was transferred to the newly created character "蛇", narrowing its meaning.

=== Change of character meanings ===
Li Dasui identifies three cases:

1. The meaning is extended in scope. For example, the character "河" originally only referred to the Yellow River in China, but later its meaning was extended to "rivers". The character 江 originally referred to the Yanzi River in China, but now refers to large rivers in general.
2. The meaning is reduced in scope. For example, "子" used to mean both "sons" and "daughters", but later narrowed to only include "sons".
3. The meaning is converted. For example, the character "涕" originally meant "tears", but now it means “nasal mucus”. The original meaning of "脚" was "lower leg", and now means "foot, feet". Usually, changes in word meaning are caused by meaning extension.

== Character meanings and word meanings ==
The meaning of a Chinese character is the morpheme meaning recorded in it. The meaning of a single-character word is its character meaning. The meaning of a multi-character word is generally derived from the meanings of the characters. The main ways to combine character meanings into word meanings include:

=== Reduplication ===
- The meaning of the character and the meaning of the word are kept the same. For example: 爸 (father), 爸爸 (father); 姐 (sister), 姐姐 (sister); 星 (stars), 星星 (stars).
- The meaning of the character is changed only in degree, scope or tone. For example: 剛 (just, firm, hard), 剛剛 (just a moment ago); 常 (constant), 常常 (often); 僅 (only, merely), 僅僅 (only, merely).
- The meaning of the character is changed to a related, but different meaning. For example: 人 (person), 人人 (everyone, every person); 天 (day), 天天 (every day); 處 (place), 處處 (everywhere).

=== Combination ===
- Compounds may be formed by combining synonym characters. For example: 聲音 (sound), 明亮 (bright), 等待 (wait), 誕生 (be born, birth). In these words, each character individually may also have other meanings, and the compound word acquires the meaning that they have in common.
- Compounds may be formed by combining antonym characters: 反正 (anyway, in any case) = 反(contrary) + 正 (correct, straight, proper); similarly, 買賣 (buying and selling), 前後 (before and after), 開關 (switch on and off), 呼吸 (breathing, breath out and in).
- Compounds may be formed by combining characters with related meanings. For example: 桌椅 (tables and chairs), 父母 (parents, father and mother), 品德 (character, quality and morality), 花草 (flowers and grass), 講解 (explanations, literally "speak and interpret").

=== Modification ===
- The meaning of the first character may modify or narrow the meaning of the second character. For example: 紅旗 (red flag), 植物 (plant = planted + thing), 微笑 (smile = slight + smile, laugh).
- The meaning of the second character may supplement the meaning of the first character. For example: 提高 (improve = lift + high), 縮小 (reduce = shrink + small), 學會 (learn = learn + well).
- The second character may apply with a meaning that has been narrowed by the first. For example: 年輕 (young = age + light), 心慌 (flustered = heart + nervous), and 手巧 (skillful = hands + skill).
- A verb may acquire a specific meaning when used with a certain object, in which case the pair functions as a compound word made of a verb and an object that would be translated into one verb in English. For example: 讀書 (reading = read books), 唱歌 (singing = sing songs), 結果 (results = bear fruit).

=== Character meanings are synthesized into word meanings in a primary-secondary relationship ===
The main character meaning is generally the lexical meaning of the word, and the secondary character meaning is generally the grammatical meaning of the word.

- The meaning of the first character may be supplementary, with the meaning of the second character being primary. For example: 老師 (teacher), 容易 (easy), 阿姨 (aunt).
- The meaning of the first character may be primary, with the meaning of the second character being secondary. For example: 國家 (country), 石頭 (stone), 桌子 (table), 房間 (room), 花朵 (flower).

=== Meaning is added or transferred ===
- The meaning of different characters may be added to form a new, related concept. For example: 景物 (scenery) = "景" as in 景致 (view) + "事" as in 事物 (things).
- The meaning of different characters may be added to form a new concept that is not directly derivable from the individual meanings. For example: 毛病 (fault, defect) = 毛 (hair) + 病 (illness).

=== Complex Examples ===
The aforementioned types of word formation may combine further:

- 前前后后/前前後後 (before and after): 前后 (around, literally "before and after") combine as antonym characters, then each is reduplicated in an AABB pattern.
- 平平安安 (peace and quiet): 平 (flat, equal, calm) and 安 (calm, safe, fix, fit, etc.) combine as synonyms to narrow each other's meanings, then each is reduplicated in an AABB pattern.
- 写字台/寫字臺 (writing desk): 写 (write) and 字 (letter) combine as verb+object to form 写字 (writing characters), which modifies 台 (desk).
- 圆珠笔/圓珠筆 (ballpoint pen): 圆 (round) modifies 珠 (pearl), and the resulting compound modifies 笔 (pen).
- 创造性/創造性 (creativity): 创 (to begin, to create) and 造 (to make, to build) combine as synonyms to narrow each other's meanings, then the formed compound further combines with the suffix 性 (-ity, -ness).
- 科学家/科學家 (scientist): 科 (study, division, field, laws, etc) complements the meaning of 学 (learn, study) to form 科学 (science), further combining with 家 (home, family), which as a suffix contributes the meaning of "one who specializes".

=== New expression ===
Professor Huang Changning and his team adopted a simple and effective method for corpus annotation. The relationships between the meanings of a compound word and its characters are divided into five types:

1. Same meaning, that is, A+B=A=B, such as "聲音" (sound) = "聲" (sound) = "音" (sound).
2. Combined meanings, that is, A+B=A+B, such as "品德" (moral character) = "品" (character) and "德" (morality)
3. Combination with an added meaning, that is, A+B=A+B+C, such as "景物" (scenery + real objects, + viewable).
4. Partial meaning, that is, A+B=A or B, for example, "國家" (country) = "國" (country) + "家" (house, family); "容易" (easy) = "容" (allow, hold) + "易" (easy).
5. Transference of meaning i.e. A+B=C, for example “東西” (things) ≠ “東” (east) + “西” (west).

According to sampling statistics, categories 2 and 3 account for 89.7% of the compound words.

Caution is necessary when inferring the meaning of a word based on the meanings of its characters. Understanding the main ways in which character meanings are combined into word meanings is helpful to Chinese learners, but needs to be complemented with references to avoid incorrect inferences.

== See also ==
- Chinese character forms
- Chinese character sounds
- Modern Chinese characters
