= Chinese character forms =

Chinese character forms (simplified Chinese: 汉字字形; traditional Chinese: 漢字字形; pinyin: hànzì zìxíng) are the shapes and structures of Chinese characters. They are the physical carriers of written Chinese.

Modern Chinese characters appear in the form of square blocks. There are two methods to analyze the forms of Chinese characters, source tracing analysis (溯源分析) and current status analysis (現狀分析, 现状分析). Source tracing analysis is also called the method of character creation (造字法). It takes the form of a character when it was created (本字) as the object of analysis. Current status (or current situation) analysis takes the current regular script standard form (標準楷體, 标准楷体) as the object. As an academic subject, modern Chinese characters pay more attention to current status analysis.

Current status analysis studies how the writing units are combined level by level into a complete Chinese character. There are three levels of structural units of Chinese characters: strokes (笔画; 筆劃), components (部件), and whole characters (整字). (Note: In some applications, there are smaller configuration units, e.g., stroke segments, turning points, and pixels.) For example, character 字 (character) is composed of two components, each of which is composed of three strokes:

字 = 宀(㇔㇔㇇) + 子(㇇㇚㇐).

== Strokes ==
Strokes (bǐhuà; 筆劃; 笔画) are the smallest writing units of Chinese characters. When writing a Chinese character, the trace of a dot or a line left on the writing material (such as paper) from pen-down to pen-up is called a stroke.

Stroke number is the number of strokes of a Chinese character. It varies, for example, characters "一" and "乙" have only one stroke, while character "齉" has 36 strokes, and "龘" (three 龍s, dragons) consists of 48 strokes.

Stroke forms refer to the shapes of strokes. The stroke forms of a standard Chinese character set can be classified into a stroke table (or stroke list), for instance, the Unicode CJK strokes list has 36 types of strokes:

Stroke order has two meanings:

1. The order of a stroke, or the direction in which a stroke is written, for example, stroke "㇐" (heng, horizontal) is written from left to right, stroke "㇑" (shu, vertical)" is written from top to bottom.
2. The order of strokes in a character, i.e., the order in which strokes are written to form a Chinese character, for example, the stroke order of character 千 is "㇓㇐㇑".

Because the direction of strokes is relatively simple, people generally refer to the latter meaning when talking about stroke order.

Strokes can also be used for Chinese character sorting. The important stroke-based sorting methods include stroke-count sorting, stroke-count-stroke-order sorting, GB stroke-based sorting and YES sorting.

Strokes combine with each other in a Chinese character in different ways. There are three types of stroke combinations between two strokes:

1. Separation: the strokes are separated from each other. Such as: 八, 三, 小.
2. Connection: the strokes are connected, such as 匕, 正, 厂, 弓, 凹, 凸.
3. Intersection: the strokes are intersected. Such as: 十, 丈, 車.

== Components ==
Chinese character components (Pinyin: hànzì bùjiàn; Traditional Chinese: 漢字部件; Simplified Chinese: 汉字部件) are Chinese character building blocks composed of strokes. In most cases, a component is larger than a stroke (i.e., consists of more than one stroke) and smaller than the whole character (combines with some other components to form a character). For example, in character "件", there are two components (亻 and 牛), each with more than one strokes, (亻: ㇓㇑) and (牛: ㇓㇐㇐㇑). In the special cases of one-stroke characters, such as 一 and 乙, a stroke is a component and is a character.

Chinese character component analysis is to divide or separate a character into components. There are two ways for Chinese character dividing, hierarchical dividing and plane dividing. Hierarchical dividing separate layer by layer from larger to smaller components, and finally get the primitive components. Plane dividing separate out the primitive components at one time. Hierarchical dividing can display the external structure of Chinese characters, while plane splitting can be regarded as omitting the higher splitting levels, and directly writing out the final separating result of primitive components.

A component that can independently form a character is a character component, or a component of independent character formation (成字部件). For example, component 口 formed character 口 independently, and is a component in characters 另, 洁 and 唱. A component that can not independently form a character is a non-character component, or a component of dependent character formation (非成字部件). For example, 冂 is not a character in modern Chinese, but it is a component in characters 同, 钢 and 岗.

A component that cannot be (further) divided into smaller components by the rules is a primitive component, or basic component (基礎部件, 基础部件). Primitive components are the final-level components of hierarchical dividing. For example, components 田 and 力 in character 男. A component composed of two or more primitive components is a compound component (合成部件). For example, component 咅 in character 陪, 部 and 菩.

Radicals (部首) and pianpangs(偏旁) are components. In Chinese characters, radicals are mostly semantic pianpangs, such as the radicals of 說, 湖, 打.

The structure of a Chinese character is the pattern or rule in which the character is formed by its (first level) components. Chinese character structures include:

- Single-component structure: The character is formed by a single primitive component, such as 口, 日 and 月.
- Left-right structure: The character is formed by a component on the left and another one on the right, such as 好, 部 and 件.
- Up-down structure: The character is formed by a component above another component, such as 号,召 and 昌.
- Surrounding structure: One component is completely or partially surrounded by another component, such as 國, 同, 區, 函, 历, 司 and 进.

== Whole characters ==
A Chinese whole character (Pinyin: hànzì zhěngzì; Traditional Chinese: 漢字整字; Simplified Chinese: 汉字整字) is a complete Chinese character. It lies at the final level of the stroke-component-character Chinese character composition. According to their structures, Chinese characters can be divided into undecomposable characters and decomposable characters.

=== Undecomposable characters ===
An undecomposable character (独体字) consists of one primitive component, which is directly formed by strokes and can not be decomposed into smaller components. In the "Specification of the Undecomposable Characters Commonly Used in the Modern Chinese" (现代常用独体字规范), there is the "List of Modern Commonly Used Undecomposable Characters" (256 characters in stroke-based order):

一乙二十丁厂七卜八人入儿匕几九刁了刀力乃又三干于工土士才下寸大丈与万上小口山巾千川个歹久么凡丸及广亡门丫义之尸己已巳弓子卫也女刃飞习叉马乡丰王开井天夫无云专丐木五不犬太歹尤车巨牙屯戈互瓦止少曰日中贝内水见午牛手气毛壬升夭长片斤爪父月氏勿丹鸟六文方火为斗户心尺丑巴办予书玉未末击正甘世本术丙石戊龙平东卡凸业木且甲申电田由史央冉皿凹四生矢失乍禾丘白斥瓜乎用甩乐匆册鸟主立半头必永民弗出矛母耳亚臣吏再西百而页夹夷虫曲肉年朱臼自血卤舟亦衣产亥羊米州农严求甫更束两酉来卤里串我身囱言羌弟事雨果垂秉肃隶承革柬面重鬼禹首兼象鼠

It is estimated that the number of undecomposable characters accounts for approximately 4% of modern Chinese characters.

=== Decomposable characters ===
A decomposable character (合体字) consists of more than one component. There are two frequently used modes of component combination in the study of Chinese character structures: first-level component combination and primitive component combination.

According to first-level component combination, the structures of decomposable characters can be divided into 13 categories:

1. Left to right (⿰, 2FF0 (Note: Unicode 2FF0, IDC (Ideographic description character) LEFT TO RIGHT)), for example: 部, 件, 結 and 構.
2. Left to middle and right (⿲, 2FF2): 衡, 班 and 辯.
3. Above to below (⿱, 2FF1): 要, 思 and 想.
4. Above to middle and below (⿳, 2FF3): 鼻, 曼 and 率.
5. Full surround (⿴, 2FF4): 圍, 國 and 囪
6. Surround from above (⿵, 2FF5): 問, 同 and 風
7. Surround from below (⿶, 2FF6): 凶, 画 and 函
8. Surround from left (⿷, 2FF7): 匡, 匠 and 匣
9. Surround from upper left (⿸, 2FF8): 廣, 居 and 病.
10. Surround from upper right (⿹, 2FF9): 句, 可 and 氧.
11. Surround from lower left (⿺, 2FFA): 這, 建 and 題.
12. Surround from lower right (N/A)：斗 and 头.
13. Overlaid (⿻, 2FFB): 巫, 爽 and 承.

According to primitive component combination, the structures of decomposable characters can be divided into:

- A. For characters composed of two primitive components, there are 9 different structures, as shown by the following example characters: 吕认压达勾问区凶团.
- B. For characters composed of three components, there are 21 different structures, such as: 荣花型培树缠抛挺润抠捆部庶厢逞逊闾圄幽乖巫.
- C. For characters composed of four components, there are 20 different structures, such as: 营蕊蓝寤嫠筐辔椁摄燃游榧额韶欧剩腐遮阔匿.
- D. For characters composed of five components, there are 20 different structures, such as: 赢蒿膏寝蘧嚣篮樊搞澡缀渤漉髂齁敲酃戳魔噩.
- E. For characters composed of six components, there are 10 different structures, such as: 臀翳麓瀛灌骥歌豁豌衢.
- F. For characters composed of seven components, there are 3 different structures, such as: 戆麟饕.
- G. For characters composed of eight components, there is 1 structure, such as: 齉.
- H. For characters composed of nine components, there is 1 structure, such as: 懿.

=== Fonts ===
The popular fonts of modern Chinese characters include Song or Ming (宋體, 明體; 宋体, 明体), Fangsong (仿宋體, 仿宋体), Kai (regular, 楷體, 楷体), Li (clerical, 隸體, 隶体), Hei (black, sans-serif, 黑體, 黑体) and Wei (魏體, 魏体).

In Chinese, in addition to the international "points" system, a unique "number" (字号) system is used for character sizes. For example, the Simplified Chinese version of MS Word allows setting font sizes by points or by numbers. The sizes of the number systems include (in ascending order of font sizes):

Size No. 8 (八号), No. 7 (七号), Small No. 6 (小六号), No. 6 (六号), Small No. 5 (小五号), No. 5 (五号), Small No. 4 (小四号), No. 4 (四号), Small No. 3 (小三号), No. 3 (三号), Small No. 2 (小二号), No. 2 (二号), small No. 1 (小一号), No. 1 (一号), Small initial number (小初号), Initial number (初号).

== See also ==
- Chinese character sounds
- Chinese character meanings
- Chinese character structures
- Modern Chinese characters
