= Modern Chinese characters =

Chinese characters used in modern languages

Modern Chinese characters (Traditional Chinese: 現代漢字; Hong Kong and Macau Chinese: 現代漢字; Simplified Chinese: 现代汉字; Pinyin: xiàndài hànzì) are the Chinese characters used in modern languages, mostly in modern Chinese, and additionally in modern Japanese and Korean. Chinese characters are composed of components, which are in turn composed of strokes. The 100 most frequently used characters cover (i.e., having an accumulated frequency of) over 40% of modern Chinese texts. The 1000 most frequently used characters cover approximately 90% of the texts. There are a variety of novel aspects of modern Chinese characters, including that of orthography, phonology, and semantics, as well as matters of collation and organization and statistical analysis, computer processing, and pedagogy.

== Background ==
=== Historical development ===
Since maturing as a complete writing system, Chinese characters have had an uninterrupted history of development over more than 3,000 years, with stages including

- Oracle bone script,
- Bronze script,
- Seal script,
- Clerical script, and
- Regular script,

leading to the modern written forms, as illustrated by the development of character 馬; 'horse':

Historical evolution of the character 馬 'horse'
Oracle	Bronze	Seal		Clerical	Regular	
Oracle	Bronze	Large	Small	Clerical	Traditional	Simplified

In 1980, Zhou Youguang, often considered to be the "father of pinyin", published a paper entitled "Introduction to the Studies of Modern Chinese Characters"—within, he detailed aspects of the numbers, orders, forms, sounds, meanings, and pedagogy regarding the modern characters. His paper was followed by Gao Jiaying's "A Brief Discussion on the Establishment of Modern Chinese Character Studies", and other related writings on the subject. At least five textbooks have been published in this area.

=== Regional varieties ===
Chinese characters were originally invented for writing the Chinese language, and were later employed for other East Asian languages, developing as part of a shared orthographic tradition. Among the application places, for ordinary and historical purposes, simplified characters are primarily used in mainland China, Singapore, and Malaysia, traditional characters are used in Taiwan, Hong Kong, and Macau, along with kanji in Japan, hanja in Korea, and chữ Hán in Vietnam. For example, the traditional character 廣; 'wide', 'broad' has the simplified form 广 and the shinjitai kanji form 広.

=== Characteristics ===
In contrast with the Latin alphabet used to write many languages, including English, Chinese characters have many divergent properties, including:

- being in a two-dimensional block structure
- potentially having dozens of strokes
- denoting a morpheme in most cases
- Normally one character is read as one syllable.
- Texts written in Chinese characters are intelligible to readers of different dialects and different dynasties.

=== Sources ===
Modern Chinese characters include:

- Received characters as standardized for both simplified and traditional Chinese, accounting for about 75% of modern characters, e.g. 日 (sun), 月 (moon), 金 (metal), 木 (wood), 水 (water), 火 (fire) and 土 (earth);
- Newly coined characters, about 2.7% of the total number, e.g. 氨 (ammonia), 碘 (iodine), 乒乓 (ping pong), 甭 (do not) and 煲 (pot);
- Repurposed ancient character with pronunciations and meanings differing from ancient ones, e.g. 她 (she), and (旮, used in 旮旯, corner);
- Simplified forms, often derived from variants already in common use, about 20%, e.g. 汉语 (漢語, Chinese language), 学习 (學習, study);
- Modern dialect characters, such as the Cantonese characters included in Hong Kong Supplementary Character Set.

== Number and sets ==
Due to the dynamic development of languages, there is no definite number of modern Chinese characters. However a reasonable estimation can be made by a survey of the character sets of relevant standard lists and influential dictionaries in the countries and regions where Chinese characters are used.

=== Mainland China ===
The standards in the People's Republic of China include the List of Frequently Used Characters in Modern Chinese (现代汉语常用字表), totalling 3,500 characters, and the List of Commonly Used Characters in Modern Chinese (现代汉语通用字表 with 7,000 characters, including the 3,500 characters in the previous list). The current standard is the List of Commonly Used Standard Chinese Characters, which was released by the State Council in June 2013 to replace the previous two lists and other standards. It includes 8,105 characters of the Simplified Chinese writing system, 3,500 as primary, 3,000 as secondary, and 1,605 as tertiary. In addition, there are 2,574 traditional characters and 1,023 variants. The character sets of Xinhua Zidian and Xiandai Hanyu Cidian, the most popular modern Chinese character dictionary and word dictionary, each include over 13,000 characters of Simplified characters, Traditional characters and variants.

=== Taiwan ===
In Taiwan, the standard is the Chart of Standard Forms of Common National Characters with 4,808 characters, and the Chart of Standard Forms of Less-Than-Common National Characters (次常用國字標準字體表), with 6,341 common national characters. Both lists were released by the Ministry of Education, with a total of 11,149 characters of the Traditional Chinese writing system.

=== Hong Kong ===
In Hong Kong, the standard is the List of Graphemes of Commonly-Used Chinese Characters for elementary and junior secondary education, totally 4,762 characters. The list was released by the Education Bureau, and is very influential in educational circles.

=== Japan ===
In Japan, the standard is the jōyō kanji—a list of 2,136 frequently used characters designated by the Japanese Ministry of Education, as well as 983 jinmeiyō kanji for use in personal names.

=== Korea ===
In Korea, the standard is the Basic Hanja for educational use (漢文敎育用基礎漢字, a subset of 1,800 Hanja defined in 1972 by a South Korea educational standard), and the Table of Hanja for Personal Name Use (人名用追加漢字表), published by the Supreme Court of Korea in March 1991. The list expanded gradually, and to year 2015 there were 8,142 hanja permitted to be used in Korean names.

=== Overall estimates ===
With consideration of all the character sets mentioned above, the total number of modern Chinese characters in the world is over 10,000, probably around 15,000. Such an estimation should not be counted as too rough, considering that there are totally over 90,000 Chinese characters (CJK Unified Ideographs) in Unicode, and more if every Chinese character ever appeared in the world is to be included.

A college graduate who is literate in written Chinese knows between three and four thousand characters. Specialists in classical literature or history, who would often encounter characters no longer in use, are estimated to have a working vocabulary of between 5,000 and 6,000 characters.

== Frequency ==
Chinese character frequencies are calculated on data of corpora. A corpus is a collection of texts representative of one or more languages. The frequency of a character is the ratio of the number of its occurrences in the corpus to the total number of characters of the corpus. The formula for calculating frequency is "F_{i} = n_{i} /N × 100%", where n_{i} is the number of times a certain (i^{th}) Chinese character appears in the corpus, and N is the total number of (occurrences of) characters in the corpus.

=== Origins ===
The first person to make a statistic study on the frequency of Chinese characters was Chen Heqin (陳鶴琴). In the 1920s, he and his assistants spent two years manually counting the characters in a corpus of 554,478 characters, and obtained 4,261 different characters with frequency information. They then compiled a book, Applied Lexis of Vernacular Chinese (語體文應用字彙). The 10 most frequently used characters in their corpus are, by descending frequency,

的 (of), 不 (no, not), 一 (one, a), 了 (PERF), 是 (the copula), 我 (I/me), 上 (on, up), 他 (he, him), 有 (have), 人 (person).

=== CUHK survey ===
In 2001, the Chinese University of Hong Kong (CUHK) published a number of frequency lists on their website, entitled "Hong Kong, Mainland China and Taiwan Chinese Frequency: a Trans-regional Diachronic Survey". The frequency data came from a grand corpus with a number of sub-corpora representing the Chinese languages in the three regions of Hong Kong, mainland China and Taiwan and in the two time periods of the 1960s and 1980s–90s. Each sub-corpus includes about 5,000 different characters, as shown by their frequency lists.

From the data of these frequency lists, some important and interesting features of Chinese can be discovered:

1. 的, 一 and 是 are the three most frequently used characters across the regions and time periods of the corpora. 的 is number one in all the frequency lists.
2. The 10 most frequently used characters across the three regions and two time periods are very consistent. That means a frequently used character in one region or period is very likely to be frequently used in another region or period.
3. The 100 most frequently used characters in the 80s and 90s cover (i.e., have an accumulated frequency of) 41.00% of the Hong Kong texts of that period, 41.34% of the mainland texts, and 41.88% of the Taiwan texts. That is more than 4 out of every 10 characters for the three regions.
4. The 1000 most frequently used characters in the 80s and 90s cover 89.25% of the Hong Kong texts of that period, 90.26% of the mainland texts, and 88.74% of the Taiwan texts.

=== Chinese government survey ===
Large-scale surveys by the Ministry of Education and the State Language Commission of PRC over the years have shown that the use of Chinese characters and words has a strong distribution pattern. The number of characters used in modern Chinese has stayed stable at about 10,000 for a few years. The number of most frequently used characters with a coverage rate of 80%, 90%, and 99% is about 590, 960, and 2,400 respectively.

Chinese character frequency is essential to quantitative research of Chinese characters and has been applied to language teaching, dictionary composition, character lists compilation, Chinese character information processing, etc.

== Orders ==
The orders or sorting methods of Chinese dictionaries and other lists of text entries are traditionally divided into three categories: form-based orders, sound-based orders and meaning-based orders. In modern Chinese, people also use frequency orders.

=== Form-based ===
In form-based ordering, characters and words are sorted according to various features of the forms or shapes of Chinese characters. Compared to sound-based orders, form-based orders have the advantages of allowing lookup of characters and words without knowing their pronunciations, as well as effective collation of large character sets without support from other sorting methods. There are two subcategories of form-based orders: stroke-based orders and component-based orders, which further includes radical-based orders, etc.

=== Sound-based ===
There are two major sound representation systems for Standard Chinese: pinyin and bopomofo. Accordingly, there is a pinyin alphabetical order and a bopomofo-based order.

=== Meaning-based ===
Meaning-based orders, also called semantics-based orders, arrange characters and words in a hierarchical structure of semantic categories.

=== Frequency-based ===
Frequency-based ordering arranges Chinese characters by their frequency of uses, normally in descending order. That means the most frequently used character is at the top of the list.

=== Orders of words ===
Chinese words consist of one or more characters. Single-character words can be sorted by a character order, and multi-character words can be sorted character by character in a similar way.

== Forms ==
Modern Chinese characters appear in the form of square blocks. There are three layers or levels of structural units of Chinese characters: strokes, components, and whole characters. (Note: In some applications, there are smaller configuration units, e.g., stroke segments, turning points, and pixels.) For example, 字 (character) has two components, each of which is composed of three strokes:

字 = 宀: ㇔㇔㇇ + 子: ㇇㇚㇐.

=== Strokes ===
Strokes (traditional Chinese: 筆劃; simplified Chinese: 笔画; pinyin: bǐhuà) are the smallest writing units of Chinese characters. When writing a Chinese character, the trace of a dot or a line left on the writing material (such as paper) from pen-down to pen-up is called a stroke. Stroke number is the number of strokes of a Chinese character. It varies, for example, characters 一 and 乙 have only one stroke, while character 齉 has 36 strokes, and 龘 (composed of three 龍; 'dragon') consists of 48 strokes.

Stroke forms refer to the shapes of strokes. The stroke forms of a standard Chinese character set can be classified into a table, for instance, the Unicode CJK strokes list has 39 types of strokes:

Stroke order is the order in which strokes are written to form a Chinese character. For example, the stroke order of 千 is ㇓，㇐，㇑.

=== Components ===
Chinese characters are composed of components (部件; bùjiàn), which are in turn composed of strokes. In most cases, a component is larger than a stroke (i.e., consists of more than one stroke) and smaller than the whole character (combines with some other components to form a character). For example, in character 件, there are two components, 亻 and 牛, each with more than one stroke (亻:㇓㇑, 牛: ㇓㇐㇐㇑). In the special cases of one-stroke characters, such as 一 and 乙, a stroke is a component and is a character.

Chinese character component analysis is to divide or separate a character into components. There are two ways for Chinese character dividing, hierarchical dividing and plane dividing. Hierarchical dividing separates layer by layer from larger to smaller components to get the primitive components. Plane dividing separates out the primitive components all at once.

A component that can independently form a character is a character component, or a component of independent character formation (成字部件). For example, component 口 formed character 口 independently, and is a component in characters 另, 洁 and 唱. A component that can not independently form a character is a non-character component, or a component of dependent character formation (非成字部件). For example, component 冂 in character 同, 鋼 and 岗.

A component that cannot be (further) divided into smaller components by the rules is called a primitive component or basic component (基礎部件; 基础部件). Primitive components are the final-level components of hierarchical dividing. For example, components 田 and 力 in character 男. A component composed of two or more primitive components is a compound component (合成部件). For example, component 咅 in character 陪, 部 and 菩.

=== Whole characters ===
'Whole characters' (Chinese: 整字; pinyin: zhěngzì) lie at the final level of the stroke–component–character composition. A non-decomposable character (獨體字; 独体字) consists of one primitive component, which is directly formed by strokes and can not be decomposed into smaller components. A decomposable character (合體字; 合体字) can be broken down into multiple components.

The structure of a Chinese character is the pattern or rule in which the character is formed by its (first level) components. Chinese character structures include:

- Single-component structure (i.e., a non-decomposable character): The character is formed by a single primitive component, such as 口, 日 and 月.
- Left–right structure: The character is formed by a component on the left and another one on the right, such as 好, 部 and 件.
- Up–down structure: The character is formed by a component above another component, such as 号, 召 and 昌.
- Surrounding structure: One component is completely or partially surrounded by another component, such as 國, 同, 區, 函, 历, 司 and 进.

Popular typefaces of modern Chinese characters include:

- Song (宋體; 宋体) or Ming (明體; 明体),
- Fangsong (仿宋體; 仿宋体),
- Regular script,
- Clerical script (隸體; 隶体),
- Hei or "black" (黑體; 黑体) and
- Wei (魏體; 魏体).

In Chinese, in addition to the international point system, a unique 'number' (字號; 字号) system is used for character sizes. For example, the Simplified Chinese version of Microsoft Word allows setting font sizes by either points or numbers. And there are studies on the design and application of modern Chinese characters with the combination of "implication" and "graphic".

== Phonology ==
The standard pronunciation of Chinese characters is based on the Beijing dialect of Mandarin. Normally, a character is read with one syllable. Some Chinese characters have more than one pronunciation (polyphonic characters). Some syllables correspond to more than one character (homophonic characters).

=== Polyphonic characters ===
Polyphonic characters (多音字) are characters with two or more pronunciations (heteronyms), as opposed to monophonic characters with only one. A polyphonic monosemous character (多音同義字) has two or more pronunciations of the same meaning. For example, the English word 'ton' is transliterated as 吨; 噸, with two pronunciations of dūn and dùn coexisting in some old dictionaries, both sharing the meaning of 'ton'. Since 噸 is both a character and a word, it is a polyphonic monosemous character, as well as a polyphonic monosemous word.

In December 1985, the Chinese government published the Table of Mandarin Words with Variant Pronunciation (普通话异读词审音表) to define the standard pronunciations for polyphonic monosemous characters. In Taiwan, there is a similar official standard for Mandarin words with variant sounds, where pronunciations are expressed in bopomofo instead of pinyin.

A polyphonic polysemous character (多音多義字) has two or more pronunciations, and different pronunciations represent different meanings. For example, character 长; 長 is pronounced cháng with the meaning of 'long', or zhǎng with the meaning of 'grow'. The simplified character 脏 is pronounced as zāng from traditional character 髒; 'dirty' or as zàng from traditional character 臟; 'internal organs'. The pronunciation of such characters is determined by the meaning intended.

Polyphonic polysemous characters may hinder the learning and application of Chinese characters and should be reduced. There are two main methods:

- Change pronunciation. A common approach is to change rare and sub-frequent sounds to more frequent readings and change ancient pronunciations to modern pronunciations.
- Change form. It means changing some sounds and meanings to be expressed by other characters.

=== Homophones ===
Homophonic characters (同音字) are those sharing the same pronunciation, as opposed to heterophonic characters (異音字; 异音字). Homophonic characters are either narrowly understood as having identical initials, finals, and tones, or more broadly as merely having identical initials and finals, with tones possibly differing. For example, 馬、瑪、碼、獁、螞 are all pronounced mǎ, while 媽; mā, 麻; má, 馬; mǎ, 駡; mà, 嗎; ma are homophones only in the broader sense. Usually, people understand homophony in characters as referring to the narrow sense.

Homophonic characters are widespread in Mandarin: there are around 1,300 possible syllables, including tonal distinctions—excluding tones, the number of different syllables drops to 400. Meanwhile, the written language has more than 10,000 characters, for an average of 7.5 characters mapped to each syllable.

Zhou Youguang introduced two ways homophones have been historically reduced:

- Differentiate character pronunciations without changing the word. For example: 癌症; 'cancer' was originally pronounced yánzhèng, later changed to áizhèng due to confusion with 炎症; yánzhèng; 'inflammation');
- Differentiate words and pronunciation. For example: 期终; 期終 (qízhōng, end-term) was confused with 期中 (qízhōng, mid-term), later the synonym 期末 (qímò, end-term) began to be used instead.

=== Others ===
There are two systems for phonetic notation of Chinese characters.

- Bopomofo: for example, 香港; 'Hong Kong'，ㄒㄧㄤㄍㄤ
- Pinyin: for example, 香港; Xiānggǎng

In pinyin, either diacritics (e.g., mā) or numbers (ma1) may be used to mark tones. The Jyutping system for Cantonese uses numbers, e.g. 香港; hoeng1 gong2

Kun'yomi are readings of kanji using native Japanese words mapped to the meanings of borrowed Chinese characters. Characters have also been borrowed with on'yomi readings with borrowed Sino-Japanese pronunciations. For example, when Chinese character 山; shān; 'mountain' was borrowed to Japan, people read it with either a native kun'yomi pronunciation of yama, or with a Sino-Japanese on'yomi pronunciation of shan. These phenomena also appear in Mandarin and English, such as i.e. being read aloud as 'that is'. Qiu Xigui called it 同义换读; 同義換讀; 'synonymous reading').

== Semantics ==
In modern Chinese, a character may represent a word, a morpheme in a compound word, or alternatively a meaningless syllable combined with some other syllables or characters to form a morpheme. In a language, morphemes are the minimal units of meaning. Some characters have only one meaning, some have multiple meanings, and some characters largely share the same meaning.

=== Monosemous and polysemous characters ===
A character with only one meaning is a monosemous character, and a character with two or more meanings is a polysemous character. According to statistics from the Chinese Character Information Dictionary, among the 7,785 mainland standard Chinese characters in the dictionary, there are 4,139 monosemous characters, 3,053 polysemous characters and 593 meaningless characters.

The meaning people assigned to a character when it was created is the original meaning (本義; 本义) of the character. For example, the original meaning of 兵; bīng is 'weapon' (斤; jīn; 'cutting knife') being held with both hands 八).

The meaning developed from the original meaning of a character through association is the extended meaning (引申義; 引申义). For example, 士兵; 'soldier' is an extended meaning of 兵.

The meaning added through the loan of homonymous sounds is the phonetic-loan meaning (假借義; 假借义). For example, the original meaning of 其; qì is 'dustpan': its use as a third-person pronoun is due to a phonetic loan.

=== Synonyms ===
Synonym characters are a group of characters that have the same or similar meaning. The characters in a synonym group often differ in frequency of use and word-formation ability, and there are some (subtle) differences in meaning and emotional color. The knowledge of synonym characters will help students write Chinese more correctly and express meanings more accurately.

Both 面 and 臉 have the meaning of 'face', but there are some differences. Generally, 面 is not used as an independent word in Mandarin, but only in multi-character compounds. For example, 見面; 'to meet', 面目; 'face and eyes', 面紅耳赤; 'red face', 面黃肌瘦; 'yellow face with thin muscles'. The 面 in these words cannot be equivocated with 臉. In contrast, 臉 can usually be used alone in Mandarin as its own word, as well as in compounds such as 臉譜; 'facial makeup', 花臉; 'painted face', 娃娃臉; 'baby face', 圓臉; 'round face' and 方臉; 'square face', 一張可愛的臉; 'a cute face'. The 臉 in these words cannot be replaced by 面.

=== Meanings of characters and words ===
The meaning of a single-character word is its character meaning. The meaning of a multi-character word is generally derived from the meanings of the characters. The relationships between the meaning of a compound word and of its characters are categorized as follows:

1. Synonyms (AB = A = B), such as word 聲音 (sound) = 聲 (sound) = 音 (sound)
2. Synthetic meaning (AB = A + B), such as 品德 (moral character) = 品 (character) + 德 (morality)
3. Expanded meaning (AB = A + B + ε), such as 景物 (scenery) = 景 (view) + 物 (thing) + ('for sightseeing')
4. Partial meaning (AB = A or B, but not the other), for example 國家 (country) = 國 (country) but not 家 (family), 容易 (easy) = 易 (easy) but not 容 (countenance).
5. Complementary meaning (AB = ε), for example 東西 (thing, stuff) is not 東 (east) + 西 (west).

According to sampling statistics, categories 2 and 3 account for 89.7% of the compound words.

== Internal structures ==
In the analysis of internal structures, Chinese characters are decomposed into internal structural components or pianpangs in relations with the sound and meaning of the characters.

=== Traditional classification ===
In Shuowen Jiezi, Xu Shen proposed six categories (traditional Chinese: 六書; simplified Chinese: 六书; pinyin: liùshū; lit. 'six writings') of Chinese characters, including

1. Pictograms (象形; xiàngxíng; 'form imitation'), single-semantic-component characters which are drawings of the objects they represent.
2. Simple ideograms (指事; zhǐshì; 'indication'), express an abstract idea with an iconic form.
3. Compound ideographs (會意; 会意; huìyì; 'joined meaning'), combine two or more semantic components to indicate the meaning of the character.
4. Phono-semantic characters (形声; 形聲; xíngshēng; 'form and sound'), consist of phonetic components and semantic components.
5. Derivative cognates (轉注; 转注; zhuǎnzhù; 'reciprocal meaning'), two characters had similar Old Chinese pronunciations and may have had the same etymological root.
6. Rebus (phonetic loan) characters (假借; 'borrowing', 'making use of'), are characters borrowed to write other morphemes with similar pronunciations.

=== Modern classification ===
The traditional liushu presupposed that every internal component can either represent the sound or meaning of the character. But, after the long evolution of Chinese writing systems, quite a few components can no longer effectively play the roles and have become pure form components. From the internal structure point of view, modern Chinese characters are composed of semantic components, phonetic components and pure form components. And they have formed seven categories of modern Chinese characters:

Semantic component characters are composed of semantic components and include:

- Pictograms, such as 田 (field), 井 (well), 門 (door).
- Simple ideograms, such as 一 (one), 二 (two), 刃 (blade).
- Compound ideographs. For example, 拿 (take): 合 (close) 手 (hands) together to take; 掰 (break apart): 分 (separate) something with two 手 (hands); 从 (follow): one 人 (person) follows another person; 泪 (tears): 氵 (water) from 目 (eyes).
- Special methods, such as 叵 (cannot): turn 可 (can) to the opposite (right) side; 冇 (none, not have): 有 (have) taken away 二 (contents).

Phonetic component characters are composed of phonetic components. For example,

- Phonetic-loan, for example, character 花 (flower) has been borrowed to mean 'spending'.
- Used in a transliterated foreign word, e.g. the characters in words 打 (dá, dozen) and 馬達 (mǎdá, motor).
- Multi-phonetic component characters, for example, 新 (xīn) was originally a semantic-phonetic character, but its modern meaning of "new" has nothing to do with the original semantic component of 斤 (jīn, 0.5 kg), but the sounds are similar. In this way, 新 (xīn) then has two phonetic components: 亲 (qīn) and 斤 (jīn).

Pure form characters are composed of form components, which neither represent the sound nor the meaning of the characters. For example:

- 日 (sun): The 日 character in modern regular script is no longer round like the sun.
- 广 (wide): The traditional character is 廣 with an effective phonetic component.
- 鹿 (deer): Oracle resembled a deer.

Semantic-phonetic characters, also called "phono-semantic characters", consist of semantic components and phonetic components. There are six combinations:

1. Left meaning (semantic) and right sound (phonetic), such as 肝 (gān, liver), 惊 (jīng, fear), 湖 (hú, lake);
2. Right meaning and left sound, such as 鵡 (wǔ, parrot), 剛 (gāng, firm), 甥 (shēng, nephew);
3. Upper meaning and lower sound: 霖 (lín, rain), 茅 (máo, cogongrass) and 竿 (gān, pole);
4. Lower meaning and upper sound: 盂 (yú, bowl), 岱 (dài, Mount Tai), 鯊 (shā, shark);
5. Outer meaning and inner sounds: 癢 (yǎng, itch), 園 (yuán, garden), 衷 (zhōng, heart), 座 (zuò, seat), 旗 (qí, flag);
6. Inner meaning and outer sound: 辮 (biàn, braid), 悶 (mèn, dull), 摹 (mó, imitation).

Semantic-form characters are composed of semantic components and pure form components. Many of these characters were originally semantic-phonetic characters. Due to subsequent changes in the pronunciation of the phonetic components or the characters, the phonetic components could not effectively represent the pronunciation of the character and became pure form. For example:

- 布 (bù, cloth): used to have signific 巾 (scarf) and phonetic 父 (fù), the phonetic component is no longer 父.
- 急 (jí, urgent): used to have semantic 心 (heart) and phonetic 及 (jí). Now the upper component no longer looks like 及.
- 鸡 (jī, chicken), is a 鸟 (bird), but not read as 又 (yòu).

Phonetic-form characters are composed of phonetic components and pure form components. They mostly came from ancient semantic-phonetic characters, where the semantic components lost their functions and became pure form. For example,

- 球 (qiú, ball): Originally refers to a kind of beautiful jade, with semantic component 王 (玉) (jade). Later, it was borrowed to represent a ball, and then extended to any spherical object, and 王 (jade) became a pure form component, while 求 (qiú) remains a phonetic component.
- 笨 (bèn, stupid): Originally refers to the inner white layer of bamboo, with semantic component 竹 (bamboo) and phonetic 本 (běn). Later, the character was borrowed by sound to mean 'stupid'.
- 华 (huá, magnificent): This is a simplified character with phonetic 化 (huà), and pure form component 十.

Semantic-phonetic-form characters consist of the three kinds of components. For example,

- 岸 (àn, bank, shore): originally had the signific ⿱山厂 and phonetic 干 (gàn). In modern Chinese, ⿱山厂 is not a character or radical with a sound or meaning, but 山 can still express meaning, while 厂 remains a pure form component.
- 聽 (tīng, listen): semantic 耳 (ear) and phonetic 壬 (tǐng). In modern Chinese characters, the right part has become a pure form component.

Semantic–phonetic–form characters are very rare and the examples above are not quite persuasive. Whether they can be justified as an internal structural category remains to be further studied. If not a category, then the classification above can also be called "New six writings".

According to Yang, among the 3,500 frequently used Chinese characters of their experiment, semantic component characters are the least, accounting for about 5%; pure form component characters account for about 18%; Semantic–form and phonetic–form characters account for about 19%. The largest group is semantic-phonetic characters, accounting for about 58%.

== Simplification ==
=== Sources ===
There are four main sources of simplified characters:

1. Ancient characters, such as: 云 (雲; 'cloud'), 礼 (禮; 'etiquette'), 后 (後; 'after')
2. Simplified Chinese characters popular in the society, such as: 体 (體; 'body'), 声 (聲; 'sound'), 铁 (鐵; 'iron').
3. Cursive regularized characters, for example: 书 (書; 'book'), 为 (爲; 'for'), 东 (東; 'east').
4. Newly coined characters, for example: 国 (國; 'country'), 拥 (擁; 'support'), 护 (護; 'protect').

=== Methods ===
The methods to simplify Chinese characters include:

==== Omitting ====
Omitting is to omit some components of the character, for example:

- Omit one side, such as 録 → 录, 號 → 号, 雲 → 云, 麗 → 丽;
- Omit both sides, such as 術 → 术, 裏 → 里;
- Omit a corner, such as 際 → 际、墾 → 垦;
- Keep a corner, such as 聲 → 声, 醫 → 医,
- Omit inside, such as 廣 → 广, 奮 → 奋;
- Omit outside, such as 開 → 开;
- Omit strokes, such as 減 → 减, 淨 → 净, 鹵 → 卤;
- Others, such as 匯 → 汇, 齒 → 齿, 瘧 → 疟, 滅 → 灭.

==== Reshaping ====
Reshaping is to change forms based on the original characters. For example,

- Change one or both components of a semantic-phonetic character, such as 驚 → 惊, 護 → 护, 響 → 响, 鐘鍾 → 钟.
- Change to semantic-phonetic characters, such as 竄 → 窜, 郵 → 邮, 樁 → 桩.
- Change components of multi-semantic characters, such as: 塵 → 尘, 筆 → 笔.
- Change to multi-semantic characters, such as: 簾 → 帘, 體 → 体, 竈 → 灶.
- Keep outline (cursive script regularized), such as: 龜 → 龟, 報 → 报, 肅 → 肃, 傘 → 伞, 齊 → 齐, 車 → 车, 堯 → 尧, 樂 → 乐, 發 → 发.
- Symbolize components, such as: 僅 → 仅, 漢 → 汉, 鄧 → 邓, 區 → 区, 師 → 师.
- Simplify radicals, such as: 訁 → 讠 (說話談... → 说话谈...), 飠 → 饣 （飲饃餓... → 饮馍饿）, 釒 → 钅 (鋼鐵銅... → 钢铁铜...).
- Others: 舊 → 旧, 靈 → 灵, 辦 → 办.

==== Replacing ====
Replacing the whole character with a character of similar sound. For example,

- 穀 → 谷 (gǔ), 後 → 后 (hòu), 幾 → 几 (jǐ), 闆 → 板 (bǎn);
- 隻 (zhī) → 只 (zhǐ), 發 (fā) and 髮(fà) → 发 (fā, fà).

=== Different views ===
It has been claimed that the general trend in the development of Chinese characters is simplification. However, recent research reported that modern Chinese characters are higher in visual complexity than their earliest known counterparts.

== Rationalization ==
The goal of Chinese character rationalization or Chinese character optimization (漢字整理; 汉字整理; hànzì zhěnglǐ) is to, in addition to Chinese character simplification, optimize the Chinese characters and set up one standard form for each of them.

=== Processing variant characters ===
Variant Chinese characters are characters with the same pronunciation and meaning but different forms, such as 夠够; gòu; 'enough' and 它牠; tā; 'it'. The existence of variant characters results in multiple forms for one character, which increases the burden of language learning and application. In the process of Chinese characters application, people need to constantly process variant characters and eliminate inappropriate ones.

There are two different principles for processing variant characters: One is conforming to the customs and simplicity. The other is to follow the original form and meaning, based on the character creation method and etymology, especially the Shuowen Jiezi.

There are two methods for processing variant characters. The selecting method is to select one of the variant characters as the standard character and eliminate the rest. The splitting method is to differentiate a group of variant characters in terms of usage to eliminate the variant relationship.

In December 1955, the Ministry of Culture and the Cultural Reform Commission of PRC jointly announced the "First List of Processed Variant Characters" (第一批异体字整理表). After some later adjustments, the list now has 796 groups of variant characters, and 1,027 characters have been eliminated.

=== Processing printing fonts ===
In January 1965, the Ministry of Culture and the Cultural Reform Commission of PRC jointly issued the General Chinese Character Forms for Printing (印刷通用汉字字形表; 字形表 Font Table in short). The Font Table contains 6,196 commonly used Song-style characters for printing. In accordance with the principles of simplicity and convenience for learning and use, a standard form was specified for each common character, including the number of strokes, structure and stroke order. After the Cultural Revolution, the Font Table was formally published. The character forms specified by it are now customarily called "new character forms", while the fonts used before were called "old character forms". The "New and Old Character Form Comparison Table" (新旧字形对照表) in many language reference books including Xinhua Dictionary and Xiandai Hanyu Dictionary are compiled and printed based on the Font Table.

Current font standards include:

- In Mainland China, the standard is the List of Commonly Used Standard Chinese Characters (通用规范汉字表), issued by the State Council on June 5, 2013. The characters are in font Song.
- In Taiwan, the standard is the Standard Form of National Characters (國字標準字體楷書母稿). The characters are in regular script.
- The standard adopted by the Hong Kong education sector is the List of Graphemes of Commonly-Used Chinese Characters (常用字字形表 ). The characters were originally handwritten, then changed to font Kai.
- The list of jōyō kanji for Japan.
- The Kangxi Dictionary (de facto) for Korea.

=== Names of places ===
In order to make place names easier to use, the Chinese government started to process the uncommon characters used in place names in 1950s.

The principles for choosing replacement characters are:

1. Same pronunciation and clear,
2. More commonly used,
3. Simple and easy to write,
4. A standard character that is popular in the local area,
5. Not to be confused with other place names.

From March 1955 to August 1964, 35 place names of county level or above were changed with the approval of the State Council. For example:

- "铁骊县" (Tieli County) was changed to "铁力县" (Tieli County),
- "鄱阳县" (Poyang County) was changed to "波阳县" (Boyang County),
- "和阗专区" (Hedian Prefecture) was changed to "和田专区" (Hetian Prefecture).

Later, in order to maintain the stability of place names, this work was suspended.

=== Measurement words ===
When the English units of measurement were translated into Chinese, there were inconsistencies in the use of characters. For example: mile: 英里 or 哩. foot: 英尺, 呎. kilowatt: 千瓦, 瓩. Therefore, the burden of language application was increased. 哩、呎、唡 etc. are specially created characters, and they also have poly-syllable sounds, which does not follow the monosyllable pattern of Chinese characters. In order to solve these problems, in July 1977, the Chinese Character Reform Commission and the National Bureau of Standards and Measures of PRC jointly issued the "Notice on the Uniform Use of Characters in the Names of Some Measurement Units" (关于部分计量单位名称统一用字的通知), establishing the metric system as the basic measurement system.

== Education ==
Chinese character education is the teaching and learning of Chinese characters. When written Chinese appeared in social communication, Chinese character teaching came into being. From ancient times to the present, the teaching of Chinese characters has always been the focus of Chinese language education.

=== Ancient education ===
In ancient times, research on Chinese character teaching focused on the preparation of various centralized literacy textbooks and dictionaries. Among them, the ones with greater impact include:

- Southern and Northern Dynasties: Thousand Character Classic, written in regular script, 502–549 AC
- Song Dynasty: Hundred Family Surnames, regular script, 960–1279
- Song Dynasty: Three Character Classic, regular script, 13th century.

The previous three books then developed into a set of teaching materials, collectively called "Three Hundred Thousand" (三百千, about 2,000 different characters), which were used for over 1000 years until the end of the Qing Dynasty, and still have a certain influence today. "Three Hundred Thousand" is arranged in rhyme form to make it catchy and easy to remember. Another influential literacy textbook is "Wenzi Mengqiu" (文字蒙求) compiled for children by the Qing Dynasty writer Wang Jun (1784－1854), which contains 2,049 characters.

=== Modern native language education ===
Modern Chinese character education is an important component of primary education in China, and an important part of literacy teaching and teaching Chinese as a foreign language.

The method is to use high-frequency characters according to frequency statistics. The important character lists include:

- "List of Frequently Used Characters in Modern Chinese" (现代汉语常用字表, State Language Commission, Beijing, 1988), 3,500 characters.
- List of Commonly Used Standard Chinese Characters (通用规范汉字表, the 3,500 primary characters in this list of 8,105 characters of the Simplified Chinese writing system, released by the State Council of PRC in June 2013,)
- Chart of Standard Forms of Common National Characters (常用國字標準字體表, Ministry of Education, Taipei, 1979), including 4,808 commonly used Chinese characters.

The Chinese character literacy movement began in the early 20th century, when the literacy level of ordinary Chinese people was quite low. Intellectuals who cared about the country and its people advocated for education to save the country and started a Chinese character literacy campaign. In June 1952, the Ministry of Education of China published a list of commonly used literacy characters, including 2,000 characters for use in literacy textbooks. In 1993, the State Language Commission published the "Character List for Literacy", which includes Table A and B. Table A contains 1,800 characters that are required for literacy in the country, and Table B contains 200 reference characters for literacy. According to UNESCO, China's illiteracy rate had dropped to only 3.6 percent by 2015.

=== Foreign language education ===
In the 3rd century AD, Chinese characters were introduced to Korea, thereafter to Japan, Vietnam and other countries. By 1989, there were more than 100 colleges and universities teaching Chinese as a foreign language in China.

From 1990 to 1991, the National Leading Group for Teaching Chinese as a Foreign Language and the Chinese Proficiency Test Center of Beijing Language Institute jointly developed the "汉语水平词汇与汉字等级大纲" (Outline of the Graded Vocabulary and Characters for HSK). The Chinese character outline contains 2,905 characters, divided into four grades: 800 Grade A characters, 804 Grade B characters, 601 Grade C characters, and 700 Grade D characters. Among them, 2,485 are first-level frequently used characters in the "现代汉语常用字表" (List of Frequently Used Characters in Modern Chinese). Teaching Chinese characters as a foreign language has received more and more attention, and many textbooks and elective courses in this area have appeared. There are now more than 200 Confucius Institutes teaching Chinese as a foreign language in the world.

== Information technology ==
Chinese character Information Technology (IT) is the technology of computer processing of Chinese characters. While the English writing system makes use of a few dozen different characters, Chinese language needs a much larger character set. There are over ten thousand characters in the Xinhua Dictionary. In the Unicode multilingual character set of 149,813 characters, 98,682 (about two-thirds) are Chinese.

=== Chinese character input ===
Sound-based encoding is normally based on an existing Latin character scheme for Chinese phonetics, such as the pinyin Scheme for Mandarin Chinese or Putonghua, and the Jyutping Scheme for the Cantonese dialect. The input code of a Chinese character is its pinyin letter string followed by an optional number representing the tone. For example, the Putonghua Pinyin input code of 香港 (Hong Kong) is "xianggang" or "xiang1gang3", and the Cantonese Jyutping code is "hoenggong" or "hoeng1gong2", all of which can be easily input via an English keyboard.

A Chinese character can alternatively be input by form-based encoding. Most Chinese characters can be divided into a sequence of components in writing order. There are a few hundred basic components, much less than the number of characters. By representing each component with an English letter and putting them in writing order of the character, the input method creator can get a letter string ready to be used as an input code on the English keyboard. Of course the creator can also design a rule to select representative letters from the string if it is too long. For example, in the Cangjie input method, character 疆 (border) is encoded as "NGMWM" corresponding to components "弓土一田一", with some components omitted. Popular form-based encoding methods include Wubi (五笔) in the Mainland and Cangjie (倉頡) in Taiwan and Hong Kong.

The most important feature of intelligent input is the application of contextual constraints for candidate character selection. For example, on Microsoft Pinyin, when the user types input code "daxuejiaoshou", he/she will get "大学教授 / 大學教授" (University Professor), when types "daxuepiaopiao" the computer will suggest "大雪飘飘 / 大雪飄飄" (heavy snow flying). Though the non-toned Pinyin letters of 大学 and 大雪 are both "daxue", the computer can make a reasonable selection based on the subsequent words.

=== Chinese character encoding for information interchange ===
Inside the computer or mobile phone each character is represented by an internal code. When a character is sent between two computers or other digital devices, it is in information interchange code. Nowadays, information interchange codes, such as ASCII and Unicode, are often directly employed as internal codes.

The first GB Chinese character encoding standard is GB2312, which was released by the PRC in 1980. It includes 6,763 Chinese characters, with 3,755 frequently used ones sorted by Pinyin, and the rest by radicals (indexing components). GB2312 was designed for simplified Chinese characters. Traditional characters which have been simplified are not covered. The code of a character is represented by a two-byte hexadecimal number, for instance, the GB codes of 香港 (Hong Kong) are CFE3 and B8DB respectively. GB2312 is still in use on some computers and the WWW, though newer versions with extended character sets, such as GB13000.1 and GB18030, have been released. The latest version of GB encoding is GB18030, which supports both simplified and traditional Chinese characters, and is consistent with the Unicode character set.

The standard of Big5 encoding was designed by five big IT companies in Taiwan in the early 1980s, and has been the de facto standard for representing traditional Chinese in computers ever since. Big5 is popularly used in Taiwan, Hong Kong and Macau. The original Big5 standard included 13,053 Chinese characters, with no simplified characters of the Mainland. Each character is encoded with a two byte hexadecimal code, for example, 香 (ADBB) 港 (B4E4) 龍 (C073). Chinese characters in the Big5 character set are arranged in radical order. Extended versions of Big5 include Big-5E and Big5-2003, which include some simplified characters and Hong Kong Cantonese characters.

The full version of the Unicode standard represents a character with a 4-byte digital code, providing a huge encoding space to cover all characters of all languages in the world. The Basic Multilingual Plane (BMP) is a 2-byte kernel version of Unicode with 65,536 code points for important characters of many languages. There are 27,522 characters in the CJKV (China, Japan, Korea and Vietnam) Ideographs Area, including all the simplified and traditional Chinese characters in GB2312 and Big5 traditional. In Unicode 15.0, there is a multilingual character set of 149,813 characters, among which overs 98,682 (about 2/3) are Chinese sorted by Kangxi Radicals.

=== Chinese character output ===
Like English and other languages, Chinese characters are output on printers and screens in different fonts and styles. The most popular Chinese fonts are the Song (traditional Chinese: 宋體; simplified Chinese: 宋体), Kai (楷體; 楷体), Hei (黑體; 黑体) and Fangsong (仿宋體; 仿宋体) families.

Fonts appear in different sizes. In addition to the international measurement system of points, Chinese characters are also measured by size numbers ( traditional Chinese: 字號; simplified Chinese: 字号; pinyin: zìhao) invented by an American for Chinese printing in 1859.

== See also ==
- Chinese characters
- Chinese character strokes
- Chinese character components
- Chinese character structures
- Chinese character information technology
- CJK characters
- Kanji
- List of Commonly Used Standard Chinese Characters
- Variant Chinese characters
- Written Chinese
