= Xiao Mountains =

Mountain range in Henan, China

Coordinates: 34.42167°N 110.79111°E

Mount Xiao or Mount Yao (Chinese: 崤山; pinyin: Xiáo Shān or Yáo Shān) is a range of mountains in western Henan, China north of the Luo River and south of Sanmenxia. Major peaks include Qīnggǎngfēng (青崗峰; 1903 m) and Guānyúnshān (冠雲山; 1666 m).

The range is part of the Xiáo (崤) historical region on the border of Hénán and Shānxī provinces in China. The area between Yáo and the strategic Hángǔ Pass was called Xiáohán (崤函).

== Name ==
There is a dispute over the pronunciation of its name. According to one of the most authoritative Mandarin Chinese dictionaries, the Cihai (辭海), xiáo should be yáo according to ancient pronunciation. However, other dictionaries such as Ciyuan (辭源), Xīnhuá Zìdiǎn, Hànyǔ Dà Cídiǎn, and Xiàndài Hànyǔ Cídiǎn use the pronunciation of xiáo.
