= Table of Mandarin Words with Reviewed Variant Pronunciations =

Mandarin standard

The Table of Mandarin Words with Reviewed Variant Pronunciations, or Putonghua Words with Reviewed Variant Pronunciations (simplified Chinese: 普通话异读词审音表; traditional Chinese: 普通話異讀詞審音表; pinyin: Pǔtōnghuà Yìdúcí Shěnyīnbiǎo), is a standard on Mandarin polyphonic monosemous words, i.e., words with different pronunciations for the same meanings. The standard was announced by the Chinese (PRC) government in 1985.

The existence of polyphonic monosemous words is a burden to language learning and application, and need to be periodically reviewed and reduced by authoritative organizations.

== History ==
In October 1957, the Chinese Character Reform Committee Mandarin Pronunciation Committee published the "First Draft of the Table of Mandarin Words with Reviewed Variant Pronunciations". In July 1959, a following part 2 of the table was published. In December 1962, part 3 was published.

In 1963, the "Draft of the General Table of Mandarin Words Including the 3-part Reviewed Variant Pronunciations" was published.

In December 1985, the State Language Commission (new name for the Chinese Character Reform Committee), the Education Commission and the Ministry of Radio and Television jointly announced the "Table of Mandarin Words with Reviewed Variant Pronunciations".

On June 6, 2016, the State Language Commission Mandarin Pronunciation Review Committee published the Table of Mandarin Words with Variant Pronunciations (Revised Draft) and a notice for soliciting opinions on the website of the Ministry of Education. The solicitation of opinions ended on June 25.

Since then, the document has remained a draft and has not been officially released. The basis for correcting pronunciations of Mandarin (such as for the "Putonghua Proficiency Test" (PSC)) is still the Table of Mandarin Words with Reviewed Variant Pronunciations (1985 edition) and the Xiandai Hanyu Cidian.，

== The 1985 table ==
Mandarin uses Beijing pronunciation as the standard, and there are some words with variant sounds (异讀詞) in Beijing pronunciation. For example, some people pronounce "波浪" (waves) bōlàng, while others pronounce it pōlàng. In order to facilitate language teaching and application, each word with different pronunciations needs to be determined a standard Mandarin pronunciation through phonetic review.

In December 1985, the State Language Commission, the Education Commission and the Ministry of Radio and Television announced the "Table of Mandarin Words with Variant Pronunciations Reviewed" (普通话异读词审音表), stipulating that "from the date of publication of the standard, departments of culture, education, publishing, broadcasting, etc. across the country, when come across Mandarin words with variant pronunciations, should follow the readings of this table."

This table has mainly reviewed words with different pronunciations in Mandarin and characters that are "morphemes" with different pronunciations (839 items in total). The mark “統讀” (uniform reading) after a character (586 such characters altogether, accounting for 69%) indicates that the character can only be read in this one sound no matter in which word it appears (soft reading is not subject to this restriction). For example, character 阀（閥） is marked with "fá, 統讀 (uniform reading)", and means the character is read fá in any word. If "uniform reading" does not appear after a character, it means that the character has several pronunciations. Some characters have two readings of Wen and Bai, and in this table are annotated with "文" (Wen, classic reading) and "语" (Yu, oral reading).

For example,

蚌（一）bàng
蛤～
（二）bèng
～埠
傍 bàng（统读, uniform reading）

龅 bāo（统读, uniform reading）
胞 bāo（统读, uniform reading）
薄（一）báo（语, oral reading）
常单用，如“纸很～”。
（二）bó（文, classic reading）
多用于复音词。
～弱 稀～ 淡～ 尖嘴～舌 单～ 厚～

where "～" stands for the head character. The complete table is available on the Wikisource.

== The 2016 revised draft ==
The Table of Mandarin Words with Reviewed Variant Pronunciations (revised draft) was edited by the Mandarin Pronunciation Review Committee of the State Language Commission. The complete table is available on the Wikisource.

== Taiwan standard ==
In Taiwan, there is a similar official standard for Mandarin words with variant pronunciations expressed in Phonetic Symbols (Bopomofo) instead of Pinyin.

== See also ==
- Chinese character sounds
- Modern Chinese characters
