= The First Series of Standardized Forms of Words with Non-standardized Variant Forms =

Chinese style guide

- Simplified Chinese: 第一批异形词整理表
- Traditional Chinese: 第一批異形詞整理表
Transcriptions
Standard Mandarin
- Hanyu Pinyin: Dì-yī pī yìxíngcí zhěnglǐ biǎo

The First Series of Standardized Forms of Words with Non-standardized Variant Forms

The First Series of Standardized Forms of Words with Non-standardized Variant Forms (Chinese: 第一批异形词整理表) published on December 19, 2001 and officially implemented on March 31, 2002, is a Standard Chinese style guide published in China. It contains 338 Standard Chinese words that have variant written forms (i.e. where the same word may be written with one or more different Chinese characters with the same pronunciation, referred to as "异形词", translated into English in the official publication as "variant forms of the same word"). In the First Series, one of the variant written forms for each word was selected as the recommended standard form.

== Content ==
Most of the decisions reached about the recommended standard forms for each word were reached based in part on statistical analysis of the usage of the variant written forms in the People's Daily during the period 1995–2000. Dictionaries consulted in the decision-making process included Xiandai Hanyu Cidian, Hanyu Da Cidian, Cihai, Xinhua Cidian and Xiandai Hanyu Guifan Cidian. Based on the evaluation of the committee, a decision was made concerning which form would be recommended to be considered as the standard form and which form(s) would be labelled as a variant form. A book was published detailing the rationales behind the decisions of the committee.

For example, the Chinese word written and pronounced as bǐngchéng in Mandarin Pinyin (meaning: to receive an order) can be written as either (1) 秉承 or (2) 稟承 / 禀承 (where both are pronounced bǐngchéng and have the same meaning). In The First Series of Standardized Forms of Words with Non-standardized Variant Forms, the first form (秉承) was recommended to be the standard form, and the second form (禀承) was designated as a variant form. The committee chose the first form (秉承) as the recommended standard form because Xiandai Hanyu Cidian and Xinhua Cidian recommended the first form (秉承) and because this form had been used 104 times in the People's Daily between 1995 and 2000. This decision was reached despite the fact that the second form (禀承) was recommended by Cihai and the committee explicitly stated that the second form was probably the more linguistically appropriate alternative based on analysis of the usage and definition of the relevant characters as found in Shuowen, Guangya, and Zuozhuan. The second form (禀承) was determined to have fallen out of popular usage in a modern context- it had been used only three times in the People's Daily between 1995 and 2000.

== Implementation ==
The Ministry of Education of the People's Republic of China has called on teachers throughout China to use and teach the forms recommended in The First Series of Standardized Forms of Words with Non-standardized Variant Forms. Before March 31, 2005, a student's use of one of the variant written forms not recommended in the First Series on a test like Gaokao would not influence points earned on a given question. Implementation of the Ministry's policy is not to influence the usage of variant written forms in research on ancient Chinese works or works written in traditional characters.
