= Epang Palace =

Archaeological site

- 阿房宫遗址
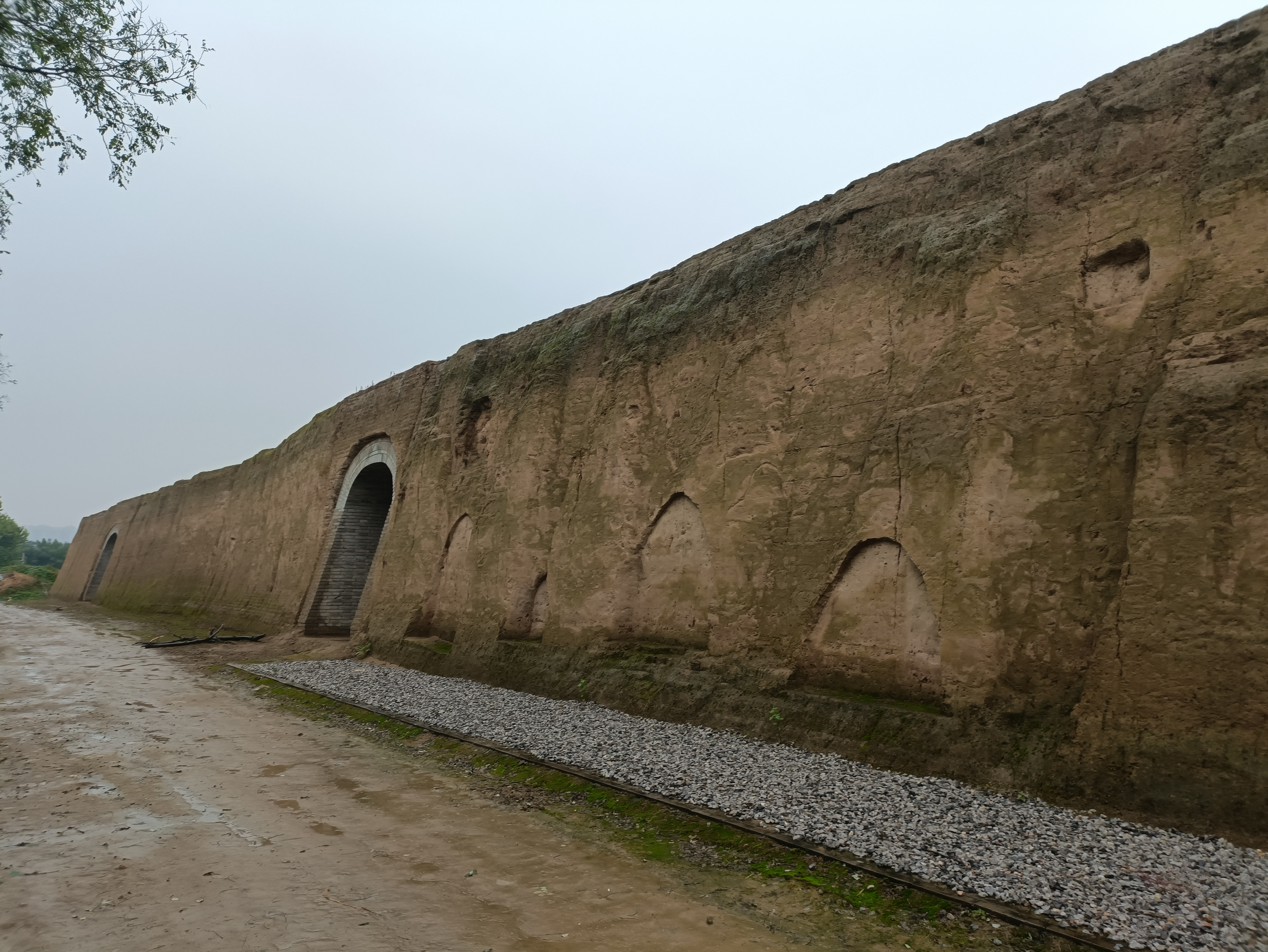
- West side of the rammed earth platform of the front hall. Epang Palace
- Established: 1961
- Location: Xi'an, Shaanxi, China
- Coordinates: 34.265004°N 108.807846°E
- Type: Archaeological site and history museum

Epang Palace
- Simplified Chinese: 阿房宫
- Traditional Chinese: 阿房宮
Transcriptions
Standard Mandarin
- Hanyu Pinyin: Ēpáng Gōng; Ēfáng Gōng
- Wade–Giles: O-pang Kung; O-fang Kung
- IPA: /ˀɤ⁵⁵ pʰɑŋ³⁵ kʊŋ⁵⁵/ /ˀɤ⁵⁵ fɑŋ³⁵ kʊŋ⁵⁵/

Epang Palace Ruins
- Simplified Chinese: 阿房宫遗址
- Traditional Chinese: 阿房宮遺址
Transcriptions
Standard Mandarin
- Hanyu Pinyin: Ēpáng Gōng Yízhǐ; Ēfáng Gōng Yízhǐ
- Wade–Giles: O-pang Kung I-chih; O-fang Kung I-chih
- IPA: /ˀɤ⁵⁵ pʰɑŋ³⁵ kʊŋ⁵⁵ i³⁵ ʈ͡ʂʐ̩²¹⁴⁻²¹⁽⁴⁾/ /ˀɤ⁵⁵ fɑŋ³⁵ kʊŋ⁵⁵ i³⁵ ʈ͡ʂʐ̩²¹⁴⁻²¹⁽⁴⁾/

The Epang or Efang Palace (simplified Chinese: 阿房宫遗址; traditional Chinese: 阿房宮遺址; pinyin: Ēfáng Gōng Yízhǐ; trans. "Remains of the Efang Palace") was a Chinese palace complex built during the reign of Qin Shi Huang, the first emperor of China and the founder of the short-lived Qin dynasty. It is located in western Xi'an, Shaanxi. Archaeologists believe that only the front hall was completed before the capital was sacked in 206 BC.

== Name ==
There are three common pronunciations of the name: Epang, Efang, and Afang. Which pronunciation should be regarded as "correct" has been subject of much debate, with the Kangxi Dictionary advocating for Epang, and the Guifan Dictionary advocating for Efang. The official transcription used on site is Epang. Afang is a mispronunciation simply based on the most common readings of each character in isolation.

The Han dynasty historian Sima Qian does not explain what the name means, but the later commentator Yan Shigu provides three possible explanations. The first is that the name refers to the broadness of the rooms (fang) of the palace. The second that e is a local name for a hill, and the name is meant to suggest the height of a room on a hill. The third is that the character fang is sometimes pronounced pang, meaning by the side, and the palace was named for being by the side of the Qin capital Xianyang.

== History ==
After Qin Shi Huang forcibly united the Warring States in 221 BC, he took a number of measures to establish his authority, including giving himself a title – commonly translated into English as "Emperor" — that was previously used only for semi-divine figures. Among these efforts included a number of grand construction projects, such as building roads and defensive walls. One such project was to be the building of a grand palace on the south bank of the Wei River, outside the capital at Xianyang. The layout of the palace was meant to reflect cosmological principles.

Construction of the palace began in 212 BC and continued after Qin Shi Huang died two years later, although work had to be delayed for a year to focus on the construction of the late emperor's tomb at Mount Li. Qin Shi Huang's son and successor Qin Er Shi has been judged by history to be an ineffectual ruler, leading to a great weakening of Qin's power. After a complicated and bloody series of power struggles, Qin Er Shi was forced to commit suicide by his formerly trusted eunuch Zhao Gao, and thereafter the Qin dynasty collapsed. According to Sima Qian, when the anti-Qin rebel and Chu aristocrat Xiang Yu entered the already-surrendered capital Xianyang a year later in 206 BC, the city was sacked and the palaces of Qin were burned to the ground. While Sima Qian does not mention it explicitly, it was long assumed throughout history that Epang Palace burnt with them.

In his Records of the Grand Historian, Sima Qian described the dimensions of the palace as being 693m long × 116.5m wide, but modern studies of the ruins have shown that its rammed earth foundation platform measured 1,320m east to west, 420m north to south, and 8m in height, making the mausoleum the largest burial complex of a single ruler ever to have been constructed anywhere in the world. Archaeologists have suggested the dimensions in Sima Qian's account are meant to be understood as referring to plans for the eventual size of the palace, had its construction not been halted, hence the discrepancy.

=== Twelve metal colossi ===
Also according to Sima Qian, the Emperor founded twelve monumental bronze statues for his palace, the Twelve Metal Colossi, each weighing about 70 tons of bronze, as one of the major endeavours of his reign. These bronze statues remained very famous in ancient China and were the object of numerous commentaries, until they were lost around the 4th century CE:

收天下兵, 聚之咸陽, 銷以為鍾鐻金人十二, 重各千石, 置廷宮中. 一法度衡石丈尺. 車同軌. 書同文字.
He collected the weapons of All-under-Heaven in Xianyang and cast them into twelve bronze figures of the type of bell stands, each 1000 dan [about 70 tons] in weight, and displayed them in the palace. He unified the law, weights and measurements, standardized the axle width of carriages, and standardized the writing system.

— Sima Qian's Records of the Grand Historian, following Liu An's Huainanzi

== Archaeology ==
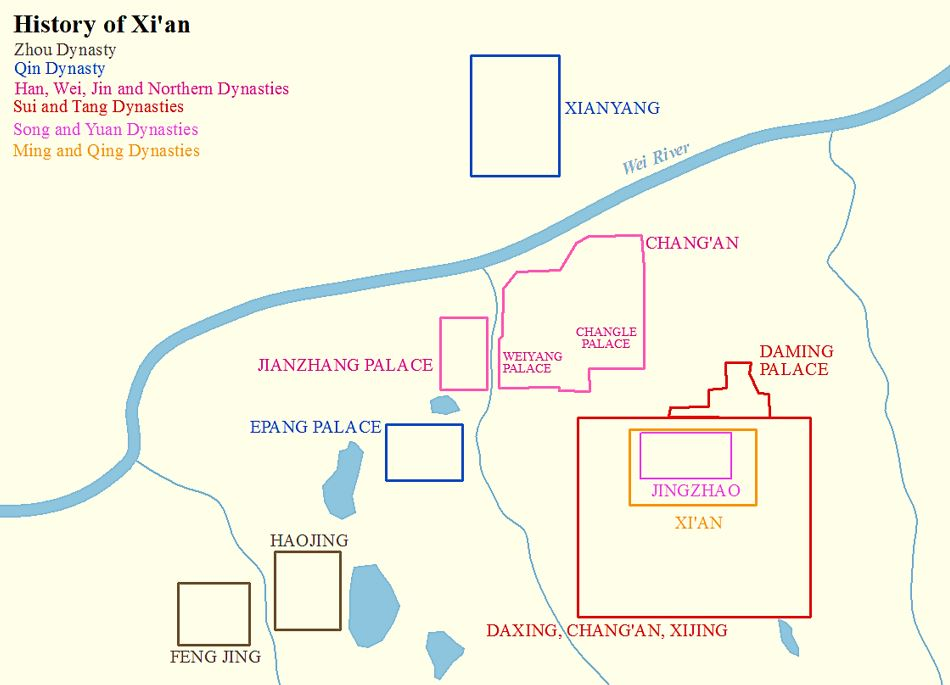
Location of the palace in western Xi'an (Ming walls in blue)

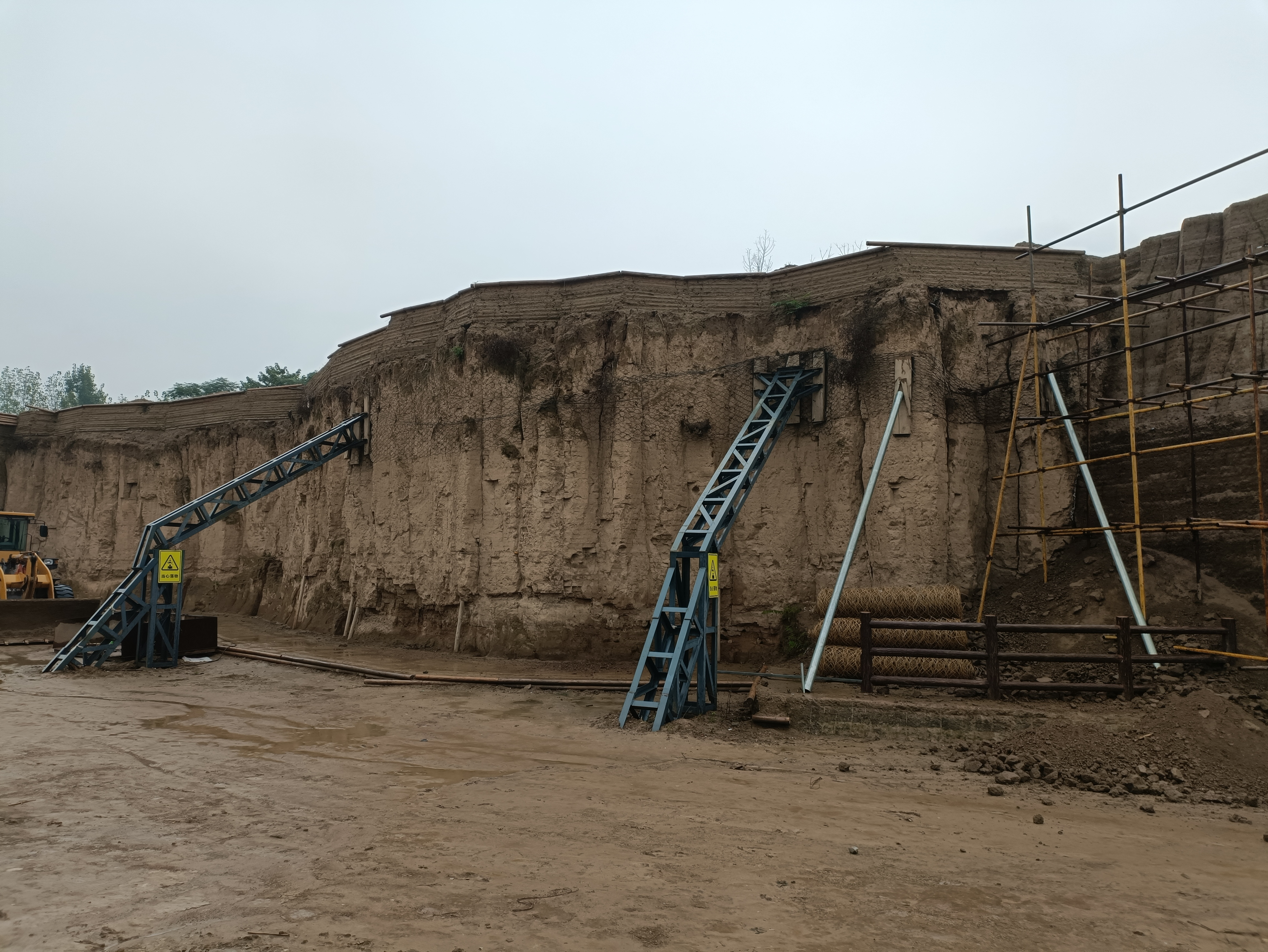
Excavation of the western side of the rammed-earth platform

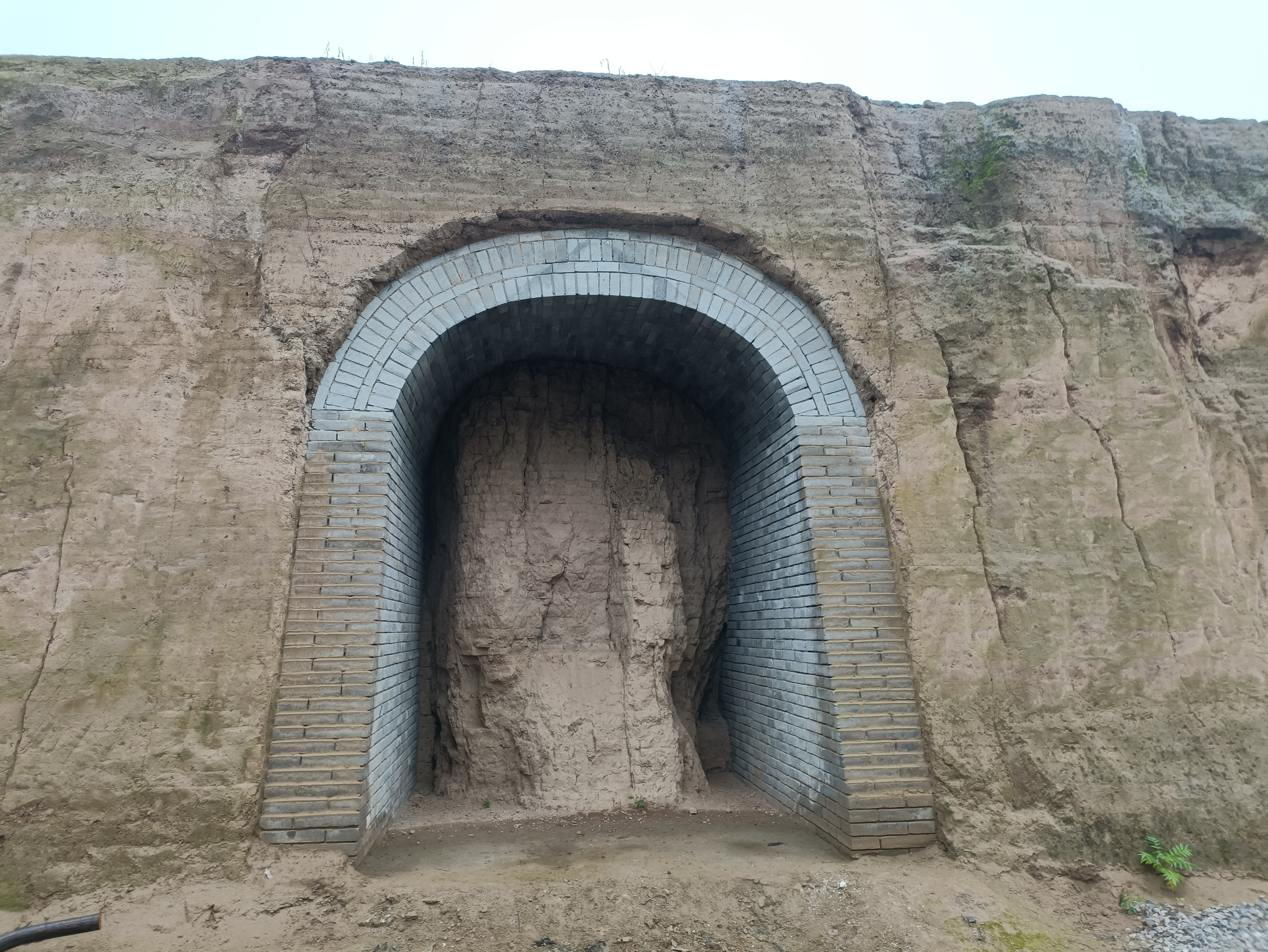
A gate of the Palace

The exact location of Epang Palace was not recorded in Sima Qian's Records of the Grand Historian, although a number of suggestions were made in other texts. The archaeological site was first discovered in 1923, based on local reports. After the interruption of World War Two and the subsequent civil war in China, Su Bingqi and He Shixing were able to confirm the location, and after many decades of excavations, it was confirmed that possibly only the front hall was constructed during the Qin dynasty, contradicting literary accounts of an opulent palace. Archaeologists believe that possibly only a wall was built upon the rammed earth foundations during the early period.

Since 1961, the site of the palace has been listed as a Major Historical and Cultural Site Protected at the National Level (1-151).

== Cultural references ==
Since Sima Qian's account of the destruction of the palace by Xiang Yu, the palace has been a symbol of the end of the Qin dynasty, with many writers emphasising the poignancy of its opulence being lost in the blaze. The Tang poet Du Mu wrote a notable rhapsody on the palace, the end of which reads:

秦人不暇自哀
而後人哀之
後人哀之
而不鑒之
亦使後人
而復哀後人也

The people of Qin had not a moment to lament their fate
Those who came after lamented it
When those who come after lament
But do not learn
Then they too will merely provide
Fresh cause for lamentation
From those who come after them.

The palace was also the subject of paintings by the Qing dynasty painter Yuan Yao and the Japanese painter Kimura Buzan, the latter of whom depicted the palace's destruction.

== See also ==
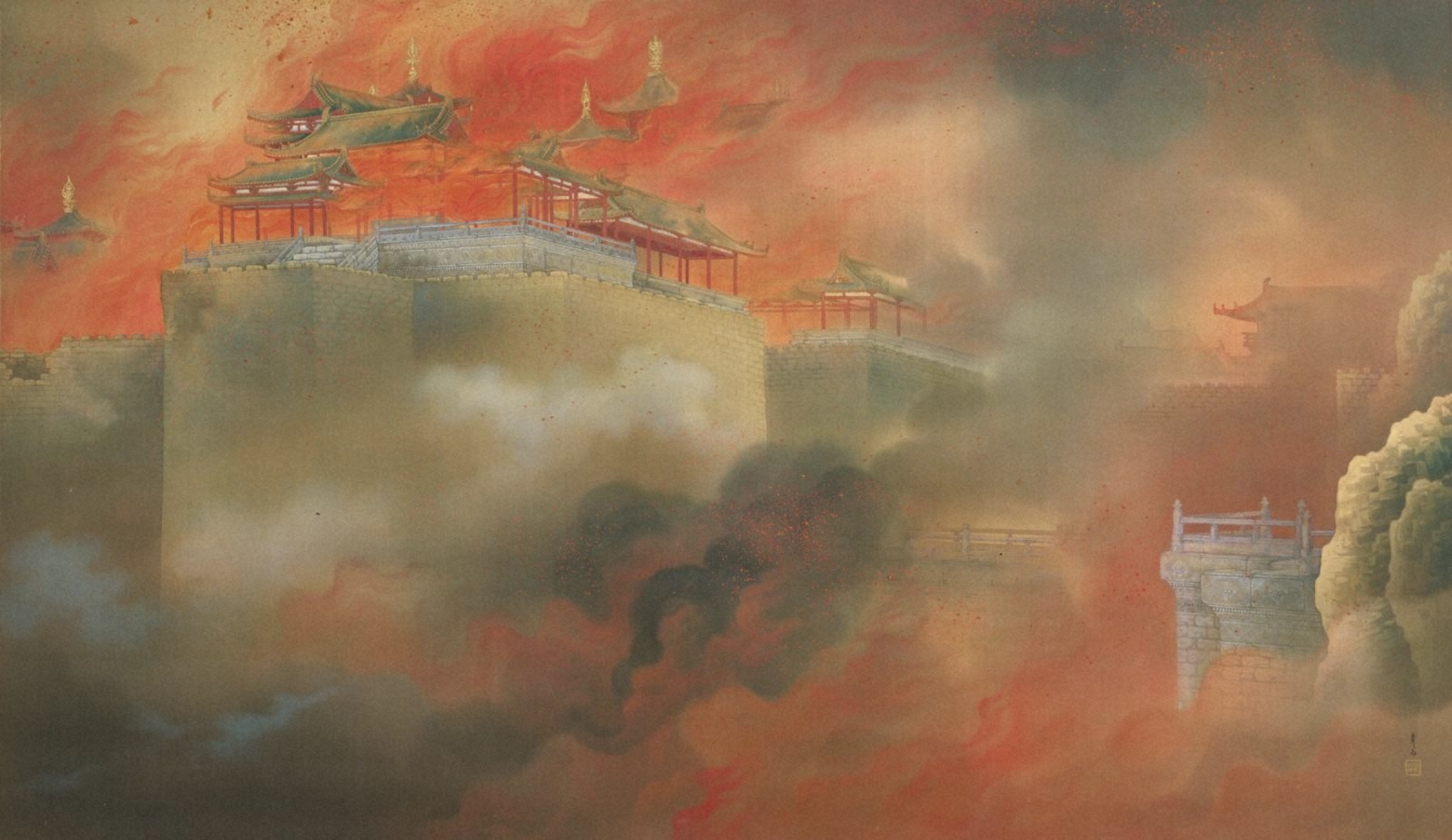
Fire Destroying the Epang Palace, by Kimura Buzan

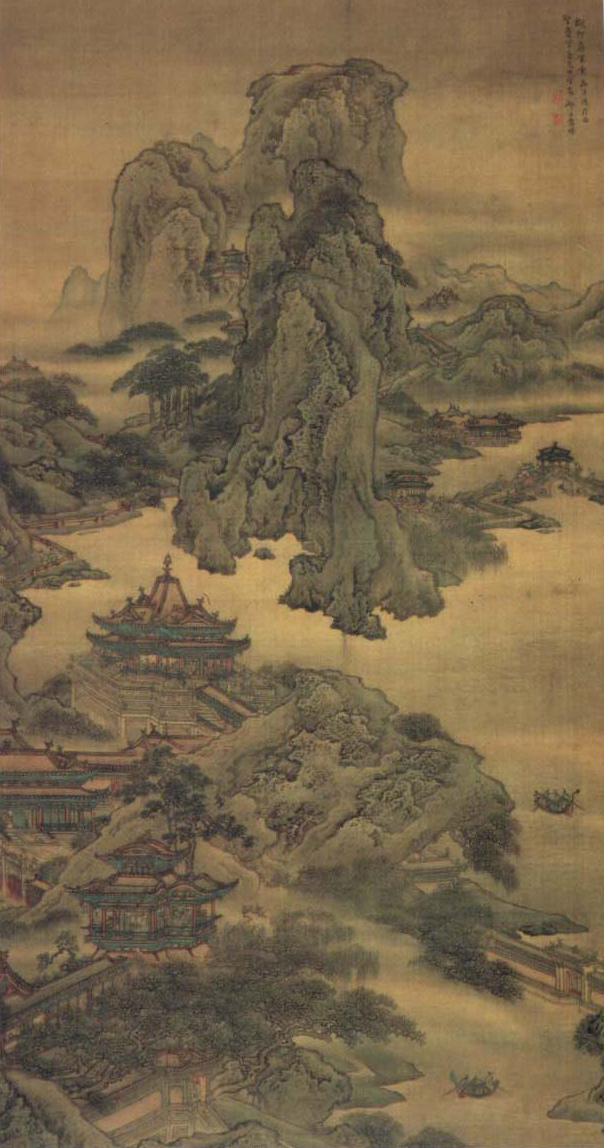
Qing dynasty painting of Epang Palace by Yuan Yao

- Unfinished building
- Chinese palace
