= Kimura Buzan =

Japanese painter (1876–1942)

- 木村武山
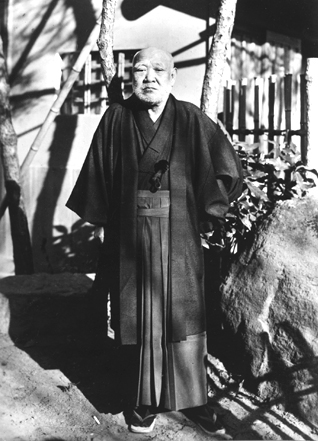
- Kimura Buzan (date unknown)
- Born: July 3, 1876; Kasama, Ibaraki, Japan
- Died: November 29, 1942 (aged 66)

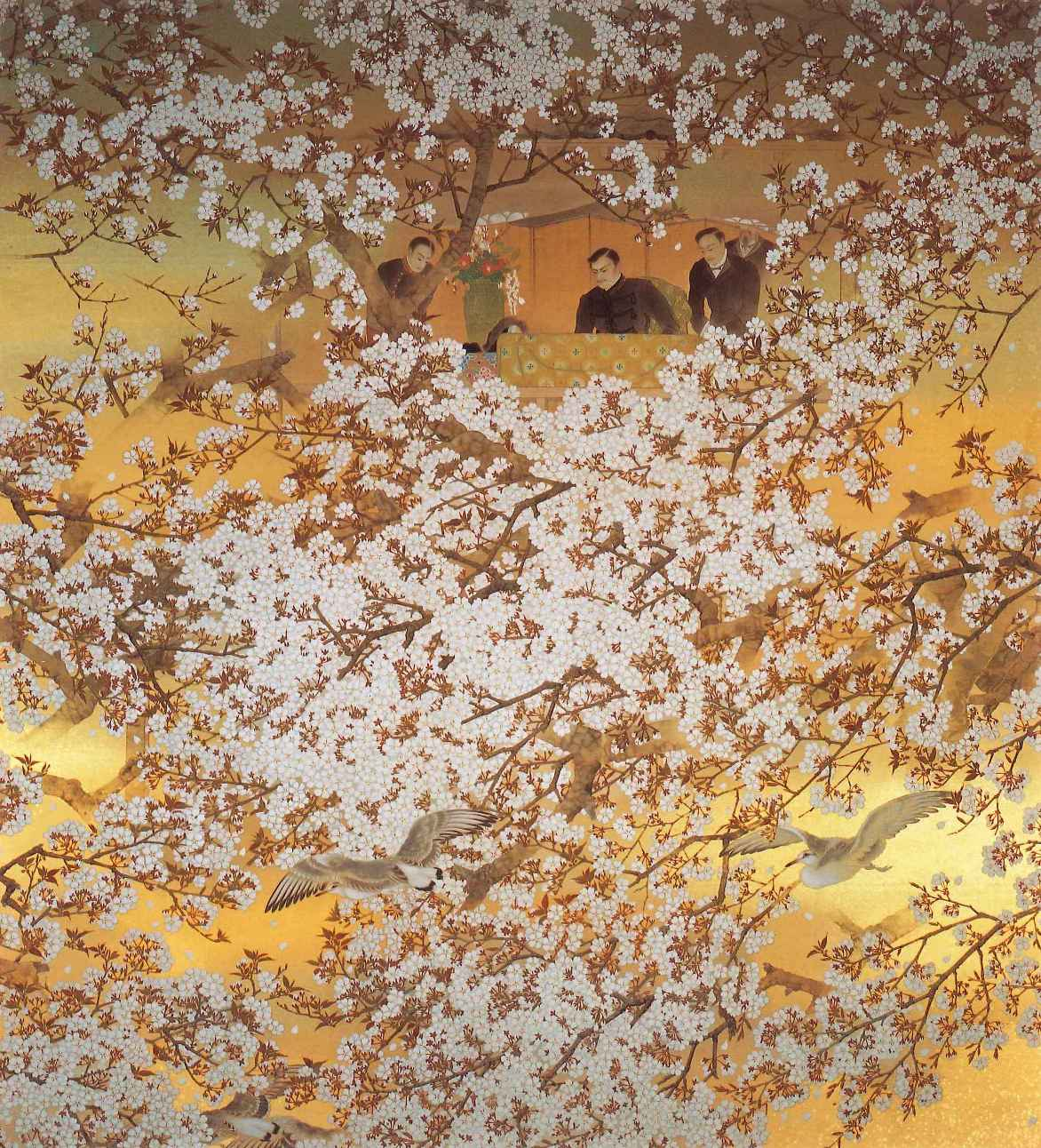
Imperial Visit to the Tokugawa Residence, Meiji Memorial Picture Gallery

Kimura Buzan (木村武山) (3 July 1876 – 29 November 1942) was a Japanese Nihonga painter associated with the Nihon Bijutsuin.

== Life ==
Born Kimura Shintarō (木村信太郎) in 1876 in Kasama, Ibaraki, the eldest son of a samurai in the Kasama Domain, as a child he studied with a Nanga master, then from his mid-teens with Kawabata Gyokusho (川端玉章). In 1896 he graduated from the Tokyo School of Fine Arts and in 1898 was involved in the foundation of the Nihon Bijutsuin.

After serving in the infantry during the Russo-Japanese War, in 1906 along with Okakura Tenshin, Yokoyama Taikan, Shimomura Kanzan, Hishida Shunsō and the Nihon Bijutsuin, he moved to Izura, now Ibaraki. The following year he contributed The Destruction of the Epang Palace by Fire to the First Bunten Exhibition. In 1914 he was involved in the revival of the Nihon Bijutsuin, dissolved upon Okakura Tenshin's death the year before.

In 1934 he completed his murals in the Kondō at Kongōbu-ji, and the following year those of the Dainichi-dō (大日堂) in Kasama. From 1937, after an intracranial haemorrhage, he painted with his left hand. He died from a chronic asthma attack in Tokyo in 1942.

== See also ==
- List of Nihonga painters
