= Ciyuan =

Chinese dictionary

Chinese name
- Traditional Chinese: 辭源
- Simplified Chinese: 辞源
- Literal meaning: source of words
Transcriptions
Standard Mandarin
- Hanyu Pinyin: Cíyuán
- Wade–Giles: Tz'u-yüan
Yue: Cantonese
- Yale Romanization: Chi^{4}yun^{4}

Korean name
- Hangul: 사원
Transcriptions
- Revised Romanization: Sawon
- McCune–Reischauer: Sawŏn

Japanese name
- Kanji: 辞源
- Hiragana: じげん
Transcriptions
- Revised Hepburn: Jigen

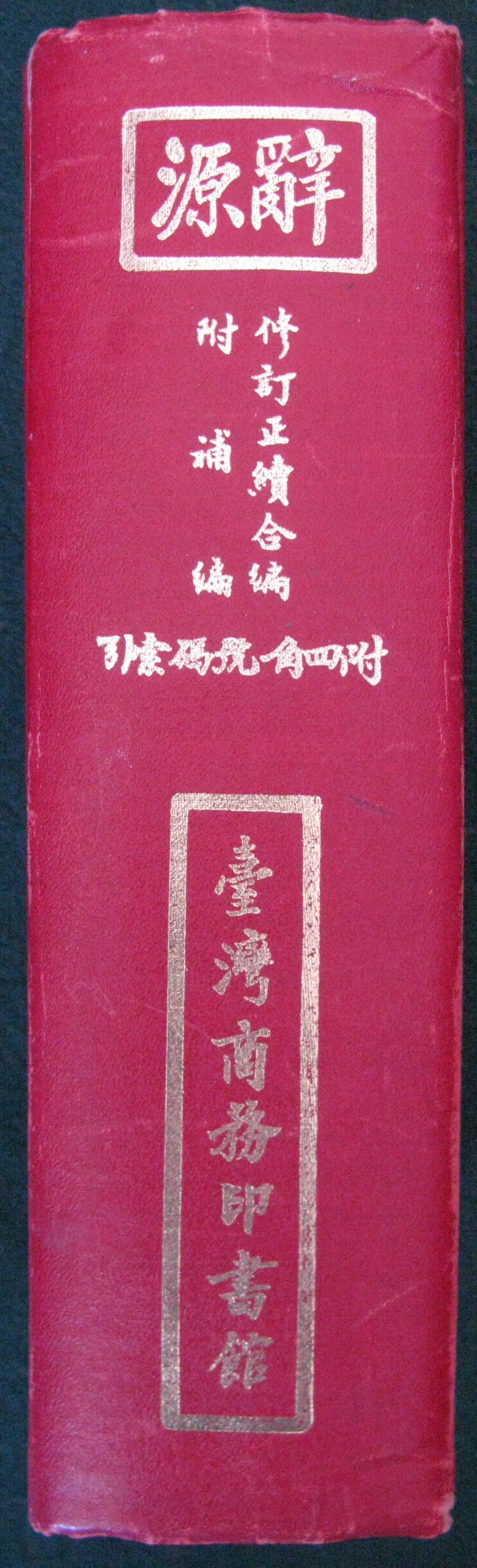
Spine of the Commercial Press single-volume 1974 edition

The Ciyuan or Tz'u-yüan was the first major Chinese dictionary linguistically structured around words (ci 辭) instead of individual characters (zi 字) used to write them. The Commercial Press published the first edition Ciyuan in 1915, and reissued it in various formats, including a 1931 supplement, and a fully revised 1979–1984 edition. The latest (3rd) edition was issued in 2015 to commemorate the centenary anniversary of its first publication.

== Contents and significance ==
In Chinese terminology, the Ciyuan is a cidian (辭典 "word/phrase dictionary") for spoken or written expressions, as opposed to a zidian (字典, lit. "character/logograph dictionary") for written Chinese characters. A character dictionary contains only the definition(s) and pronunciation(s) for a character in isolation, whereas a dictionary of words contains both individual characters and characters in words. Whereas a dictionary of discrete characters would have separate entries for zi (字, "character") and dian (典, "canon; standard"), it would not enter the compound zidian (字典, "dictionary"); a dictionary of words would include entries for zi, dian, and zidian. The Chinese language, both written and spoken, is primarily made up of words and phrases, not independent characters.

The dictionary title ciyuan 辭源 – which combines ci 辭 "take leave; decline; diction; phrase; word" and yuan 源 "source; cause; origin" – is an old variant for ciyuan 詞源 "word origin; etymology", usually written with ci 詞 "word; term; speech".

The Ciyuan has been popular with Chinese intellectuals. For example, during the Chinese Civil War, Mao Zedong carried two modern dictionaries, the Ciyuan and the Cihai.

The lexicographer Reinhard Hartmann predicts that the revised Ciyuan "should remain a basic research tool for all students of China's pre-modern literature and history for many years to come".

== History ==
The Ciyuan, which is the first major Chinese dictionary of the 20th century, has been republished and revised repeatedly.

=== First edition ===
Chinese lexicographers began compiling the first edition Ciyuan in 1908, with Lu Erkui (陸爾奎, 1862–1935) as editor-in-chief. They chiefly derived material from the 1710 Kangxi Dictionary and 1798 Jingji cuangu (經籍簒詁) dictionary of characters used in the Chinese classics. In 1915, Commercial Press, a major Chinese publishing house, issued the original Ciyuan in two volumes totaling 3,087 pages, available in large, medium, and small sizes.

It contained approximately 100,000 entries, with dictionary order by individual character head entries arranged by radical and stroke, using the traditional 214 Kangxi radicals. Phrase and compound entries are grouped under their first character, arranged firstly according to their number of characters, and secondly according to their radicals.

The Ciyuan included not only Chinese characters and phrases, but also chengyu idioms, classical references, and encyclopedic terms, such as Chinese and foreign personal and place names, book titles, and modern scientific terms. Its preface explained the lexicographical need for the Ciyuan.

In recent years new terms and new affairs have flooded into China. People from less-informed backgrounds find it hard to understand what "new learning" is about because of terms that are incomprehensible. Those who had classical knowledge often ended up giving up on new learning. On the other hand, those who went to study abroad did not understand what had already existed in their homeland when they returned. We therefore published this dictionary to indicate the history of and changes in the meanings of words, in the hopes of bridging that gap.

Each entry was followed by its pronunciation (with fanqie spelling, a common homophone, and modern Chinese rhyme), meanings, and often with illustrative quotations from the Chinese classics. However, as Têng Ssu-yü and Knight Biggerstaff say, the first edition Ciyuan "is far from exhaustive, and most of its illustrative quotations were taken from secondary sources without being checked".

=== Supplement ===
In 1931 Commercial Press published the Ciyuan xubian (辭源續編 "Source of words continuation/sequel"), compiled by Fang Yi (方毅, 1916–1997) and others, in two volumes totaling 1,702 pages. This supplementary dictionary comprises terms accidentally omitted from the 1915 edition, and new terms coined after it. Fang Yi's preface explained the reason for publishing an extended edition of the Ciyuan in 1931: "Within more than a decade and following progressive developments in the world and changes within the political scene, it is natural that in science many new words have emerged". The Xubian also cites sources of quotations in more detail than the core Ciyuan dictionary.

The 1939 Ciyuan Zhengxu heding ben (辭源正續合訂本) was a new extended edition, combined into one volume. The 1931 Ciyuan had 65,555 entries and the 1939 edition has 88,074, nearly a 35% net increase in words.

In 1969, Commercial Press in Taiwan published a one volume edition, with a Four-Corner Method index.

=== Revised edition ===
Plans for a second edition Ciyuan began after a 1958 conference about revising the Ciyuan and Cihai dictionaries. Hartmann says, "It was decided to maintain Ciyuan's emphasis on literary, historical and classical terms and to revise and augment it as a reference work for researchers and students of pre-modern Chinese".

In 1964, a weidinggao (未定稿 "draft manuscript") Ciyuan was completed, but the anti-intellectualism of the Cultural Revolution (1966–1976) halted compilation. Work resumed in 1976 as a cooperative effort between the Commercial Press and language scholars in the provinces of Guangdong, Guangxi, Hunan, and Henan. The revised Volumes 1 through 4 were published in 1979, 1980, 1981, and 1984, respectively. The revised edition Ciyuan contains 12,980 head characters, under which are 84,134 definitions of phrases, totaling 11.3 million characters. Volume 4 has a pinyin index attached.

Content of the new Ciyuan focuses on classical terms and encyclopedic items relating to Chinese literature and history up to 1840, the time of the First Opium War. The editors deleted technical terms from natural and social sciences, and international words that had been appended into the original edition Ciyuan during 60 years of revisions and updates. They also added a number of important terms; for example, "under the character "wei" ([委] "entrust; committee"), the original edition had 49 compounds, while the revised edition deletes 12 of these but adds 29 more". Since citations in the first edition Ciyuan were sometimes unclear as to sources, the editors of the revised edition rechecked every citation, corrected errors, and added references for authors and chapter numbers.

In 1988, Commercial Press published a reduced-size, single volume edition Ciyuan.

=== Third edition ===
The third edition (辞源(第三版)) was published in 2015 following 8 years of editing.("《辞源》出版百年 第三版全球同步首发". 2015-12-24.)("快讯︱《辞源》第三版问世——九大修订、纸电同步". 2015-12-24.)

== Publications ==
=== Ciyuan by The Commercial Press (China) ===
- First edition (從400萬字到1200萬字：《辭源》一百年來的修訂)

- Ciyuan (Chinese: 辭源; pinyin: Ciyuan/Chinese: 辭源正編; pinyin: Ciyuan Zhengpian): Includes over 10,000 head letters, approximately 100,000 entries.

- large print silk binding (辭源甲種/甲大本): 12 volumes.
- large print heavy paper (辭源乙種/乙大本): 2 volumes.
- large print top paper (辭源丙種/丙大本): 2 volumes.
- medium print top paper (辭源丁種/丁中本): 2 volumes.
- small print top paper (辭源戊種/戊小本): 2 volumes.
- 1st printing (1915–09 (publish)/1915-10 (print))
- 2nd printing (1915–10)
- 27th printing (1926)

- First edition (1st revision by The Commercial Press, Ltd.)

- Ciyuan xubian (辭源續編): An expansion to the previous Ciyuan.

- medium print top paper (辭源續編丁種): 1 volume.
- 1st printing (1931–12)
- 1st post-disaster printing (1932–07)
- 4th post-disaster printing (1932–08)
- ?th printing (1937)

- First edition (2nd revision by The Commercial Press, Ltd.)

- Ciyuan combined volume (辭源正續編合訂本): A compilation of previous 2 Ciyuan collections, with expansions. 1 volume.

- 1st printing (1939–06)
- 3rd printing (1949–06)
- 15th printing (1947–02)

- Ciyuan simplified edition (辞源简编本) (1949)

- Second Edition

- Ciyuan draft manuscript (辭源修訂稿序例) (1964-07)
- Ciyuan revised edition (Chinese: 辭源修訂本; pinyin: Ciyuan xiudingben): Includes 12,890 head letters and 84,134 compound words, for a total of 97,024 entries.

- Volume 1 (辭源一/辭源(修訂本)1-4第一册) (ISBN 7-100-00124-2/ISBN 978-7-100-00124-3)

1st printing (1979–07)
?th printing (1998-06-??)

- Volume 2 (辭源二/辭源(修訂本)1-4第二册) (ISBN 978-7-100-00125-0/ISBN 7-100-00125-0) (1979-08?)

- 1st printing (1980–08)
- 4th printing (1987–08)
- ?th printing (1998-07-??)

- Volume 3 (辭源三/辭源(修訂本)1-4第三册) (ISBN 978-7-100-00126-7/ISBN 7-100-00126-9)

- 1st printing (1981–02)
- ?th printing (1998-07-??)

- Volume 4 (辭源四/辭源(修訂本)1-4第四册) (ISBN 7-100-00127-7/ISBN 978-7-100-00127-4)

1st printing (1983–12)
?th printing (1998-07-??)

- Deluxe edition (辭源豪华本): 2 volumes.

- 1st printing (辭源修訂本重排本) (1983–12)

- Combined edition (辭源合訂本/辭源修訂本1-4合訂本): Compilation of 4 volumes. 1 volume.

- 1st/5th? printing (1988–07)
- 2nd printing (1989)
- ?th printing (1995-11-06)

- Single-volume condensed edition (辭源2卷合訂本) (1991): 2 volumes.
- Ciyuan xiudingben centennial collectors' edition (辭源(修訂本)世紀珍藏本): 4 volumes.

- 1st printing (2001-01-01)

- Revised edition 2-volume edition (辭源(修訂本)) (ISBN 7-100-01056-X): 2 volumes.

- ?th printing (2004-03-??)

- Revised edition PRC 60th anniversary commemorative edition (辞源(修訂本)：建国60周年紀念版/辭源修訂本紀念版建國60周年)/Ciyuan 2009 (ISBN 978-7-100-05736-3): This version uses laser layout. 2 volumes.

- 1st printing (2009-09-01)

- Revised edition rearranged edition (辭源修訂本(重排版)) (ISBN 7-100-01056-X/ISBN 978-7-100-01056-6): This version uses laser layout. 2 volumes.

- 1st printing (2009–09)
- ?th printing (2009-11-01)
- ?th printing (2010-06-01)
- 6th printing (2013–07)

- Third edition

- Ciyuan third edition (Chinese: 辭源第三版; pinyin: Ciyuan disanban) (ISBN 978-7-100-11424-0): Includes 14210 head letters, 92646 multi-letter entries, over 1000 pictures, and approximately 12 million characters. 2 volumes.

- 1st printing (2015-10-01)
- 22nd printing (2015–10)

- Ciyuan third edition USB drive version (辭源第三版優盤版) (ISBN 978-7-900284-71-6) (2015-12-01): Supports Windows XP SP3 and above. Includes fuzzy search, simplified and traditional Chinese user interface.
- Ciyuan third edition network version (辭源第三版网络版) (2015): It is an online dictionary accessible via web browser.
- Ciyuan third edition commemorative volume (辭源第三版纪念本) (ISBN 978-7-100-12560-4): 1 volume?.

- 1st printing (2016-10-01(2016-01-01?))

- Ciyuan third edition wire binding edition (辭源第三版线装本/辭源(第三版)線裝本) (ISBN 978-7-100-12956-5)： 19 volumes in 3 boxes. Includes bi-colour printing.

- 1st printing (2017-02-??)

- Ciyuan revised reference information (《辞源》修订参考资料) (ISBN 978-7-100-08333-1): An analysis of Ciyuan contents. 1 volume.

- 1st printing (2011–01)

- Ciyuan research thesis collection (《辞源》研究论文集) (ISBN 978-7-100-06082-0): A collection of 42 theses about Ciyuan's revision history. 1 volume.

- 1st printing (2009–09)

=== Ciyuan by The Commercial Press, Ltd. (Taiwan) ===
- First edition (3rd revision by The Commercial Press, Ltd.)

- Ciyuan regular-continuation chapters revised edition (Chinese: 辭源正續編修訂本; pinyin: Ciyuan Zhengzhupian Xiudngben): Based on the combined edition from the Beijing publisher, and also included the old book title at the inside of the book. Changes included replacing the original preface from the original combined edition with the Taiwan edition preface. 1 volume.

- 1st printing (1957-05-01)

- First edition (4th revision by The Commercial Press, Ltd.)

- Ciyuan revised combined edition large print volume (Chinese: 辭源正續合編修訂大字本; pinyin: Ciyuan Zhengzhu Hepian Xiudingdaziben): Includes 89944 entries. 1 volume.

- 2nd edition

- ?th printing (1968–05)

- First edition (5th revision by The Commercial Press, Ltd.)

- Ciyuan supplemental edition (Chinese: 辭源修訂正續合編附補編; pinyin: Ciyuan Xiuding Zhengzhuhepian Fubaopian): 1 volume.

- 1st revision (1968-01)
- 2nd revision (1970-01): Adds 8700 entries for a total of 98644 entries.
- ?th revision (1971)
- ?th revision (1972)
- ?th revision (1974)
- ?th revision (1976)

- First edition (6th revision by The Commercial Press, Ltd.)

- Additionally revised Ciyuan (Chinese: 增修辭源; pinyin: Zengxiu Ciyuan): It is a version of Ciyuan published by the Taiwan-based The Commercial Press, Ltd. It maintains the vertical text flow and the use of Classical Chinese texts for explanations that had been used in Ciyuan books printed before TCP had been established in Taiwan. Adds 29430 entries for total of 128074 entries in 11491 head characters. 2 volumes.

- 1st edition (1978–10):
- 4th? revision (1979)
- 7th? revision (1984)

- First edition (7th revision by The Commercial Press, Ltd.)

- Additionally revised Ciyuan (Chinese: 增修辭源; pinyin: Zengxiu Ciyuan): Adds over 7000 entries. 2 volumes.

- ?th revision (1991–??): 2 volumes.
- ?th revision (1997-03): 2 volumes.

- First edition (8th revision by The Commercial Press, Ltd.)

- Additionally revised Ciyuan (Chinese: 增修辭源; pinyin: Zengxiu Ciyuan): 2 volumes.

- 9th revision (2002?)

- First edition (9th revision by The Commercial Press, Ltd.)

- Additionally revised Ciyuan (Chinese: 增修辭源; pinyin: Zengxiu Ciyuan): Appendix sections for national census and Chinese dynasties were removed. 2 volumes.

- 11th revision (2008-03-24):

- 2-volume edition (ISBN 957-05-1373-X/ISBN 978-957-05-1373-8)
- upper volume (Chinese: 增修辭源 上册) (ISBN 957-05-1374-8)
- lower volume (Chinese: 增修辭源 下册) (ISBN 957-05-1375-6)

- Revised edition

- Continental edition Ciyuan revised edition (Chinese: 大陸版辭源修訂本; pinyin: Daluban Ciyuan Xiudingben) (ISBN 978-9-570-50659-4): It is based on the Ciyuan revised edition from the Beijing publisher, with horizontal text flow and explanations in vernacular Chinese, yet still uses traditional Chinese letters for explanations despite being marketed to mainland Chinese readers. It also includes Mandarin pronunciations in pinyin for head letters that are absent in the Additionally revised Ciyuan (in the Additionally revised Ciyuan, pronunciations are only shown in fǎnqiè form or with the closest sounding letter). However, the vocabulary range is not the same as in the Additionally revised Ciyuan (for example, baseball (棒球) is found in the Additionally revised Ciyuan, but not in the Continental edition Ciyuan revised edition), because the editors of the Ciyuan revised edition had switched the emphasis of Ciyuan to be a reference of old Chinese history and literature.

- 1st revision (1989-10-01)
- last revision (2008-06-24): 2 volumes. Includes 97,024 entries (12,890/84,134 single/multiple-letter entries).

=== Ciyuan by The Commercial Press (H.K.) Ltd. (Hong Kong) ===
- First edition

- Ciyuan modified edition (Chinese: 辭源改編本; pinyin: Ciyuan Gaipianben) (ISBN 9-620-70057-0/ISBN 978-9-620-70057-6): It is a concise and updated version of the combined volume, with addition of 2 appendix entries (units of measurement, Chinese dynasties).

- 15th printing (1951–02)
- 2nd? printing (1980)
- ?th printing (1984)

- Second edition

- Ciyuan revised edition (Chinese: 辭源修訂本; pinyin: Ciyuan Xiudingben):

- Volume 1 (ISBN 978-9-620-70051-4) (1980-02)
- Volume 2 (ISBN 978-9-620-70007-1) (1981-01)
- Volume 3 (ISBN 978-9-620-70036-1) (1982-04)
- Volume 4 ()
- Volumes 1–4 (辭源(1~4)修訂本) (ISBN 9-620-70038-4/ISBN 978-9-620-70038-5) (1980-02?)

- Ciyuan condensed combined edition (Chinese: 辭源縮印合訂本; pinyin: Ciyuan Suoyinhedingben) (ISBN 978-9-620-70092-7): Compilation of revised edition. 1 volume.

- 2nd printing (1987–10)

- Third edition

- Ciyuan all new revised edition (Chinese: 辭源全新修訂本; pinyin: Ciyuan Chuanxinxiudingben) (ISBN 978-9-620-70409-3): Based on the third edition from the Beijing version; this version adds over 6500 entries to the second edition. 2 volumes.

- 1st printing (2016–03)

=== Ciyuan by Zhongzhou Ancient Works Publishing House ===
- First edition

- Ciyuan combined volume (辭源正續編合訂本): A photocopied reprint of the Ciyuan combined volume in 1939. 1 volume.

- 1st printing (1993-08/1997-10-01)

=== Ciyuan by Tiancheng ===
- Second edition

- Literary history Ciyuan (Chinese: 文史辭源; pinyin: Wenshi Ciyuan): A version of the Ciyuan revised edition published in Taiwan-based Tiancheng (天成出版社). Changes include the use of Wade–Giles Mandarin, the removal of the romanized pronunciation character index and simplified and traditional Chinese index.

- Volume 1 (文史辭源第一册)

- 1st printing (1984–05)

- Volume 2 (文史辭源第二册)
- Volume 3 (文史辭源第三册)
- Volume 4 (文史辭源第四册)

=== Ciyuan by Random House ===
- Second edition

- Chinese Ciyuan all new revised edition (Chinese: 中文辭源(修訂本); pinyin: Zhongwen Ciyuan xiudingben) (1987-04): A version published by Taiwan-based Random House (藍燈文化事業股份有限公司).

- Volume 1 (中文辭源第一冊/中文辭源(一)修訂本)

- 1st impression (1987-04)

- Volume 2 (中文辭源第二冊/中文辭源(二)修訂本)
- Volume 3 (中文辭源第三冊/中文辭源(三)修訂本)
- Volume 4 (中文辭源第四冊/中文辭源(四)修訂本)

=== Ciyuan by Yuan-Liou Publishing Co., Ltd. ===
- Continental edition Ciyuan single volume combined edition (Chinese: 大陸版辭源單卷合訂本; pinyin: Daluban Ciyuan Danquanhedingben) (ISBN 962-07-0091-0): It is a single-volume version of the Ciyuan revised edition from the Beijing publisher. 1 volume.

- 1st Taiwan printing (1988-05-01)
- 6th Taiwan printing (1989-06-16)
- ?th printing (1994, 1996–05)

=== Ciyuan by ACME Cultural Enterprise Co., Ltd. (Acmebooks) ===
- New Ciyuan (Chinese: 新辭源; pinyin: Xin Ciyuan) (ISBN 9577755305): 1 volume.

- ?th printing (1992-09-01)

- Ciyuan (Chinese: 辭源; pinyin: Ciyuan) (ISBN 9577756921): 1 volume.

- ?th printing (1995-11-01)
- ?th printing (1996-03-15)
