= Xiandai Hanyu Cidian =

Authoritative one-volume Chinese-language dictionary

A Dictionary of Current Chinese
- A Dictionary of Current Chinese, Revised (1996) (Third Edition)
- Editors: Dictionary Editing Office, Institute of Linguistics, Chinese Academy of Social Sciences (中国社会科学院语言研究所词典编辑室)
- Language: Chinese
- Genre: Dictionary
- Publisher: Commercial Press; Foreign Language Teaching and Research Press (Chinese-English Bilingual Edition, 2002)
- Publication date: December 1978 (1st edition); September 2016 (7th edition)
- Publication place: China
- Pages: 1894 pages
- ISBN: 9787100124508

Xiandai Hanyu Cidian (simplified Chinese: 现代汉语词典; traditional Chinese: 現代漢語詞典; pinyin: Xiàndài Hànyǔ Cídiǎn; lit. 'Modern Han Language Word Dictionary'), also known as A Dictionary of Current Chinese or Contemporary Chinese Dictionary, is an important (Note: Used in the compilation of a list of official pronunciations for the Putonghua Proficiency Test.) one-volume dictionary of Standard Mandarin Chinese published by the Commercial Press, now into its 7th (2016) edition. It was originally edited by Lü Shuxiang and Ding Shengshu as a reference work on modern Standard Mandarin Chinese. Compilation started in 1958 and trial editions were issued in 1960 and 1965, with a number of copies printed in 1973 for internal circulation and comments, but due to the Cultural Revolution the final draft was not completed until the end of 1977, and the first formal edition was not published until December 1978. It was the first People's Republic of China dictionary to be arranged according to Hanyu Pinyin, the phonetic standard for Standard Mandarin Chinese, with explanatory notes in simplified Chinese. The subsequent second through seventh editions were respectively published in 1983 (Reorganized Edition- now seen as the '2nd edition'), 1996 (Revised Edition- now seen as the '3rd edition'), 2002 (2002 Supplemental Edition- now seen as the '4th edition'), 2005 (5th edition), 2012 (6th edition) and 2016 (7th edition).

In 1994, A Dictionary of Current Chinese won China's First National Book Award. The seventh edition contains about 70,000 entries including characters, words and expressions, idiomatic phrases and idioms. The dictionary is also available in digital format on CD-ROMs and Traditional Chinese digital versions.

Xiandai Hanyu Cidian was consulted in the writing of The First Series of Standardized Forms of Words with Non-standardized Variant Forms.

== Editions ==
Edition	Release date	Number of entries	ISBN
Trial Printing Edition (试印本)	1960		-
Trial Edition (试用本)	1965		-
Reprinting of 1965 Trial Edition (试用本)	1977		National Standard Book Number of China 17017·91
(1st)	1978	56,000	
Reorganization (重排本) (2nd)	1983	56,000	ISBN 7-100-00044-0
Revised (修订本) (3rd)	1996	60,000	ISBN 9787100017770
Traditional Characters Version, Edition 1 (繁體字版 第1版)	July 2001		ISBN 9620702115
2002 Supplement (2002年增补本) (4th)	2002	61,000	ISBN 9787100034777
Chinese-English Bilingual Edition	2002		ISBN 9787560031958
5th	26 July 2005	65,000	ISBN 9787100043854
6th	1 June 2012	69,000	ISBN 9787100084673
7th	1 September 2016	70,000	ISBN 9787100124508

== New entries in the 6th edition ==
Type of entries	Examples in Chinese (S)	Respective Pronunciation (in Pinyin)	Remarks	Respective English Translation
Economic	产业链, 环比, 负资产, 第一桶金, 民营企业, 非公有制经济, 文化产业	chǎnyèliàn, huánbǐ, fùzīchǎn, dìyītǒngjīn, mínyíng qǐyè, fēigōngyǒuzhì jīngjì, wénhuà chǎnyè		supply chain, compared with the last same statistical period, negative equity, first pot of gold, private enterprise, non-common ownership sector, cultural industry
Social management	医疗保险, 医改, 民调, 首问制, 调峰, 限行, 摇号, 调节税	yīliáo bǎoxiǎn, yīgǎi, míndiào, shǒuwènzhì, tiáofēng, xiànxíng, yáohào, tiáojiéshuì		health insurance, healthcare reform, opinion poll, first asked responsibility system, peak regulation, driving restriction, (licence plate) lottery, regulatory tax
Daily life	产权证, 房贷, 群租, 二手房, 廉租房, 两限房, 动车, 屏蔽门, 高铁, 轨道交通, 车贷, 车险, 代驾, 酒驾, 醉驾	chǎnquánzhèng, fángdài, qúnzū, èrshǒufáng, liánzūfáng, liǎngxiànfáng, dòngchē, píngbìmén, gāotiě, guǐdào jiāotōng, chēdài, chēxiǎn, dàijià, jiǔjià, zuìjià		property right certificate, home loan, group-oriented leasing, second-hand home, low-rent housing, apartment with double limitations, multiple unit/power car, platform screen door, high-speed rail, rail transport, car loan, car insurance, designated driving, drunk driving (0.02%<BAC<0.08%), drunk driving (BAC>0.08%)
New lifestyle	拼车, 拼购, 团购, 网购, 网聊, 瘦身, 塑身, 茶叙, 自驾游, 自助游, 背包客	pīnchē, pīngòu, tuángòu, wǎnggòu, wǎngliáo, shòushēn, sùshēn, cháxù, zìjiàyóu, zìzhùyóu, bēibāokè		carpooling, shop-pooling, group buying, online shopping, online chatting, slimming, body shaping, tea gathering, self-drive tour, DIY travel, backpacker
IT and Internet	播客, 博客, 博文, 跟帖, 超媒体, 电子书, 电子政务, 内联网, 物联网, 网评, 网瘾, 微博, 云计算	bōkè, bókè, bówén, gēntiě, chāoméitǐ, diànzǐshū, diànzǐ zhèngwù, nèiliánwǎng, wùliánwǎng, wǎngpíng, wǎngyǐn, wēibó, yúnjìsuàn		podcast, blog, blog post, follow-up thread, hypermedia, e-book, e-government, Intranet, Internet of Things, online comment, Internet addiction, microblog, cloud computing
Starting with letters	CPI, PPI, PM2.5, ETC, ECFA, FTA	Read according to English pronunciation	Native terms: 居民消费价格指数, 工业生产者出厂价格指数, 细颗粒物, 电子不停车收费, 海峡两岸经济合作框架协议, 自由贸易协定	CPI, PPI, PM2.5, ETC, ECFA, FTA (Free-trade Agreement)
Loanwords from English	晒, 博客, 微博, 丁克, 粉丝, 嘉年华, 桑拿, 舍宾, 斯诺克, 脱口秀	shài, bókè, wēibó, dīngkè, fěnsī, jiāniánhuá, sāngná, shěbīn, sīnuòkè, tuōkǒuxiù	微博 < 微 (micro-) + abbr. of 博客, 粉丝 < "fans"	share (to tell to another), blog, microblog, DINK, fan, carnival, sauna, shaping (sport), snooker, talk show
Loanwords from Japanese	刺身, 定食, 寿司, 天妇罗, 榻榻米, 通勤, 手帐, 数独	cìshēn, dìngshí, shòusī, tiānfùluō, tàtàmǐ, tōngqín, shǒuzhàng, shùdú	Original forms and readings (in Japanese): sashimi (刺身), teishoku (定食), sushi (寿司), tenpura (天婦羅), tatami (畳), tsūkin (通勤), techō (手帳), sūdoku (数独)	sashimi, teishoku (set meal), sushi, tempura, tatami, commute, diary/appointment book, sudoku
Terms from Guangdong, Hong Kong and Macau	八卦, 搞掂 (or 搞定), 狗仔队, 无厘头, 手信, 饮茶	bāguà, gǎodiān (or gǎodìng), gǒuzǎiduì, wúlítóu, shǒuxìn, yǐnchá		gossip, fixed/handled, paparazzi, funky, souvenir, yum cha
Terms from Taiwan	软体, 硬体, 网路, 数位, 太空人, 幽浮, 捷运, 呛声, 力挺, 糗, 出糗, 拜票, 谢票, 站台	ruǎntǐ, yìngtǐ, wǎnglù, shùwèi, tàikōngrén, yōufú, jiéyùn, qiàngshēng, lìtǐng, qiǔ, chūqiǔ, bàipiào, xièpiào, zhàntái		software, hardware, network, digital, astronaut, UFO, rapid transit, provoke, in support of, embarrassing, make a fool of oneself, Canvass for votes, thank for votes, show up and support

== Traditional Chinese edition ==
A traditional Chinese edition was published in 2001 by the Commercial Press (Hong Kong). It contains about 60,000 entries, with all entries labeled with Zhuyin alongside Hanyu Pinyin.

- 現代漢語詞典（繁體版） [A Dictionary of Current Chinese (Traditional Chinese edition)]. 2001. ISBN 9789620702112.
- 現代漢語詞典－繁體版光盤 [A Dictionary of Current Chinese - Traditional Chinese CD-ROM Version]. ISBN 9789620702143.

== Controversies ==
Xiandai Hanyu Cidian had given discriminatory explanations to certain words and phrases. An example was the word "homosexuality" (simplified Chinese: 同性恋; traditional Chinese: 同性戀; pinyin: tóngxìngliàn). From the first edition in the 1970s (the entry in that edition is 同性恋爱 tóngxìng liàn'ài - literally 'same-sex love') to the fifth edition in 2005 of Xiandai Hanyu Cidian, the definition of the term had been "determined" as "a type of psychological perversion". In the 2012 6th edition & 2016 7th edition, the term was redefined as "sexual behaviour between persons of the same sex".

In the sixth edition, even though it contains a large number of new vocabulary, the word 同志 Tóngzhì ("comrade") which is an informal term for "a homosexual person", was not included in the dictionary. This could be because the term is often construed as a sarcastic reference to the Chinese Communist Party, according to Sociology Professor Ding Xueliang of the Hong Kong University of Science and Technology. The original term is a common form of political address in China, e.g. Comrade Hu Jintao, Comrade Wen Jiabao.

Some detractors complained that "Entries starting with the Western alphabet" section in the 6th edition allegedly violated the regulation - "Chinese language publications shall comply with the norms and standards of the Standard Spoken and Written Chinese language" in laws such as the Law of the People's Republic of China on the Standard Spoken and Written Chinese Language and Publication Control Regulations of the State Council (State Council Act No. 594). The act of using English vocabulary in the main body of a Chinese dictionary, and using English to substitute for Chinese characters, according to these detractors, will cause the greatest damage to the Chinese characters since the romanization of Chinese, and will have a long-term negative impact on the language.

The publisher, the Commercial Press, replied that the section is meant just for easy references when looking up the dictionary. The Commercial Press says that according to a rule stated in a 2010 document by the State Council Office Secretariat, alphabetical entries recorded in Chinese dictionaries written by state authorities did not have corresponding Chinese translations. Hence, it is absolutely fine to include them in dictionaries.

== See also ==
- Dai Kan-Wa Jiten
- Han-Han Dae Sajeon
- Hanyu Da Zidian
- Xiandai Hanyu Guifan Cidian
- Zhongwen Da Cidian
- Xinhua Dictionary
