= Cihai =

Standard Mandarin Chinese dictionary and encyclopedia

Chinese name
- Traditional Chinese: 辭海
- Simplified Chinese: 辞海
- Literal meaning: sea of words
Transcriptions
Standard Mandarin
- Hanyu Pinyin: Cíhǎi
- Wade–Giles: Tz'u-hai
Yue: Cantonese
- Yale Romanization: Chi^{4}hoi^{2}

Korean name
- Hangul: 사해
Transcriptions
- Revised Romanization: Sahae
- McCune–Reischauer: Sahae

Japanese name
- Kanji: 辞海
- Hiragana: じかい
Transcriptions
- Revised Hepburn: Jikai

The Cihai is a large-scale dictionary and encyclopedia of Standard Mandarin Chinese. The Zhonghua Book Company published the first Cihai edition in 1938, and the Shanghai Lexicographical Publishing House revised editions in 1979, 1989, 1999, and 2009. A standard bibliography of Chinese reference works calls the Cihai an "outstanding dictionary".

== Contents ==
The Cihai is a semi-encyclopedic dictionary and enters Chinese words from many fields of knowledge, such as history, science, mathematics, philosophy, medicine, and law.

Chinese lexicography dichotomizes two kinds of dictionaries: the traditional zìdiǎn (字典, lit. "character/logograph dictionary") for written Chinese characters and the modern cídiǎn (辭典 "word/phrase dictionary") for spoken expressions. For example, the Hanyu Da Zidian for characters and Hanyu Da Cidian for words. The Cihai, as the title indicates, is a cídiǎn.

The American sinologist George A. Kennedy, who wrote a student's guide to using the Cihai as the basis for sinological studies, said the dictionary's principal values are its "explanations for phrases and compound expressions" and "citations illustrating the use of words and expressions."

== History ==
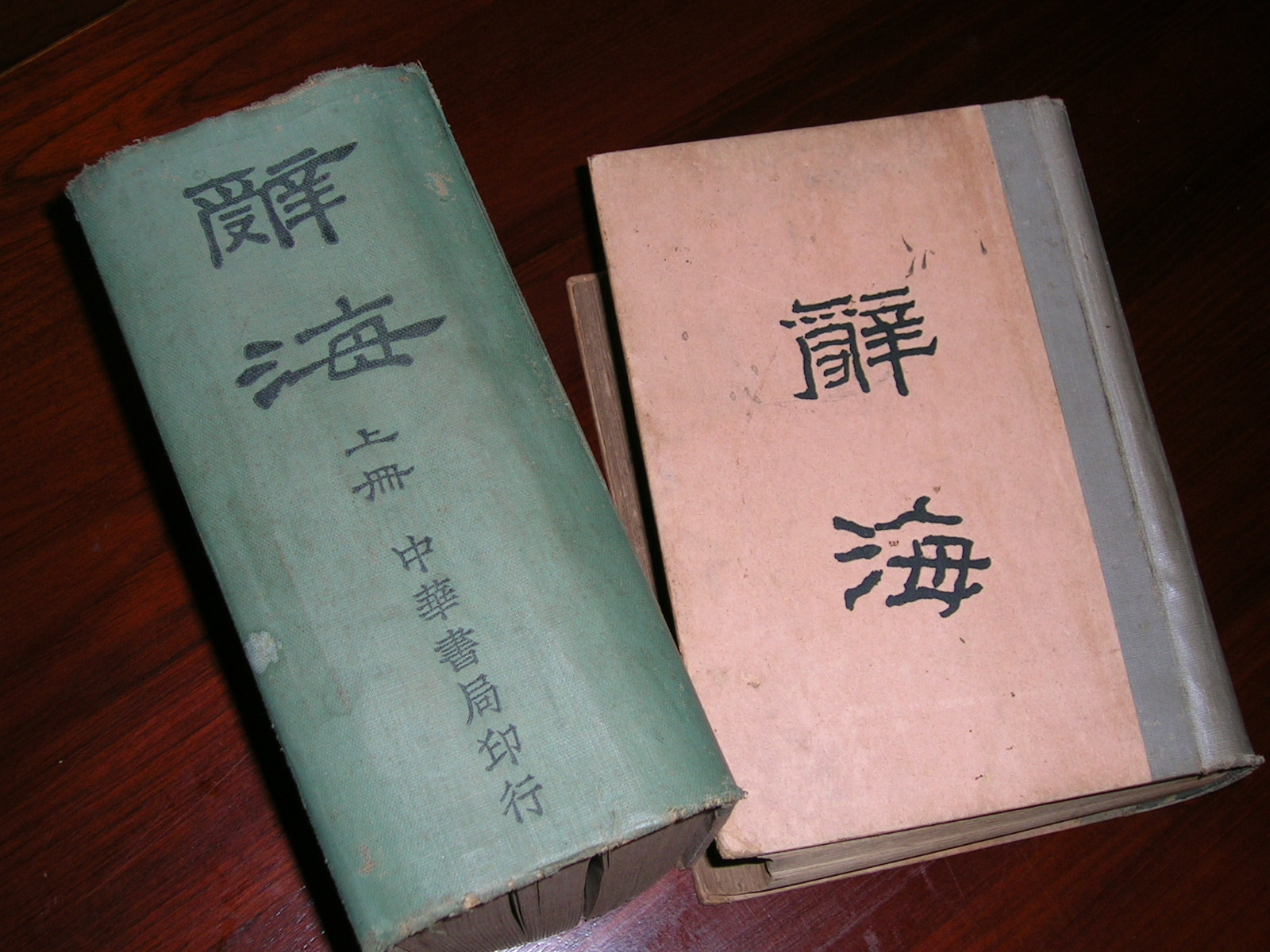
1937 first edition Cihai

The Cihai originated when Lufei Kui, founder of the Zhonghua Book Company, decided to publish a comprehensive Chinese dictionary to compete with rival Commercial Press's 1915 Ciyuan (辭源 "source of words"). Under the editorship of Shu Xincheng (舒新城, 1893–1960), Shen Yi (沈颐) and others, over 100 lexicographers worked for two decades to compile the Cihai, which was published in 1936. This 2-volume first edition has over 80,000 entries arranged under single characters in radical-stroke order, with the words and compounds under each character listed by the number of characters and strokes. The definitions are written in wenyan "literary Chinese". The Taiwan branch of Zhonghua published a Cihai reprint in 1956 with minor revisions additions and corrections.

Plans for a second edition began after a 1958 conference about revising the Cihai and Ciyuan. The Cihai Editorial Committee organized over 5000 scholars and specialists to undertake the new compilation, concentrating on revising the first edition entries and adding modern terminology, especially scientific and technical terminology. Reinhard Hartmann describes the editorial work of revising Cihai as taking "a tortuous course, 22 years from start to finish". After the original editor-in-chief Shu Xincheng died in 1960, he was succeeded by Chen Wangdao, who died in 1977, and was succeeded by Xia Zhengnong (夏征农, 1904–2008). From 1961 to 1962, sixteen shiyong (試用 "trial") individual subject-matter fascicles were distributed for comments by specialists, and in 1965 a weidinggao (未定稿 "draft manuscript") Cihai was completed, but the anti-intellectualism of the Cultural Revolution (1966–1976) halted editorial work. Shanghai Dictionary Publishing House (上海辭書出版社) published the three-volume revised edition Cihai in 1979 and a condensed single-volume version in 1980.

The revised 1979 edition has the same title and layout as the original 1936 edition, but serves a much different purpose. The first edition covers China's past and uses literary Chinese for definitions, while the second edition also covers modern China and international matters and uses baihua "colloquial speech". It contains 106,578 entries, totaling more than 13.4 million characters. The single character headwords are arranged under 250 radicals, with subsequent words listed according to stroke numbers. The third volume appends useful charts (e.g., a chronology of Chinese history), tables (weights and measures), lists (Ethnic minorities in China), and a pinyin index to single characters.

The 1989 three-volume edition Cihai was also compiled with Xia Zhengnong as editor-in-chief. It focused upon the addition of 20th-century terms, more proper names, and technical vocabulary. This third edition Cihai contains 16,534 head characters, with more than 120,000 entries, totaling over 15.8 million characters.

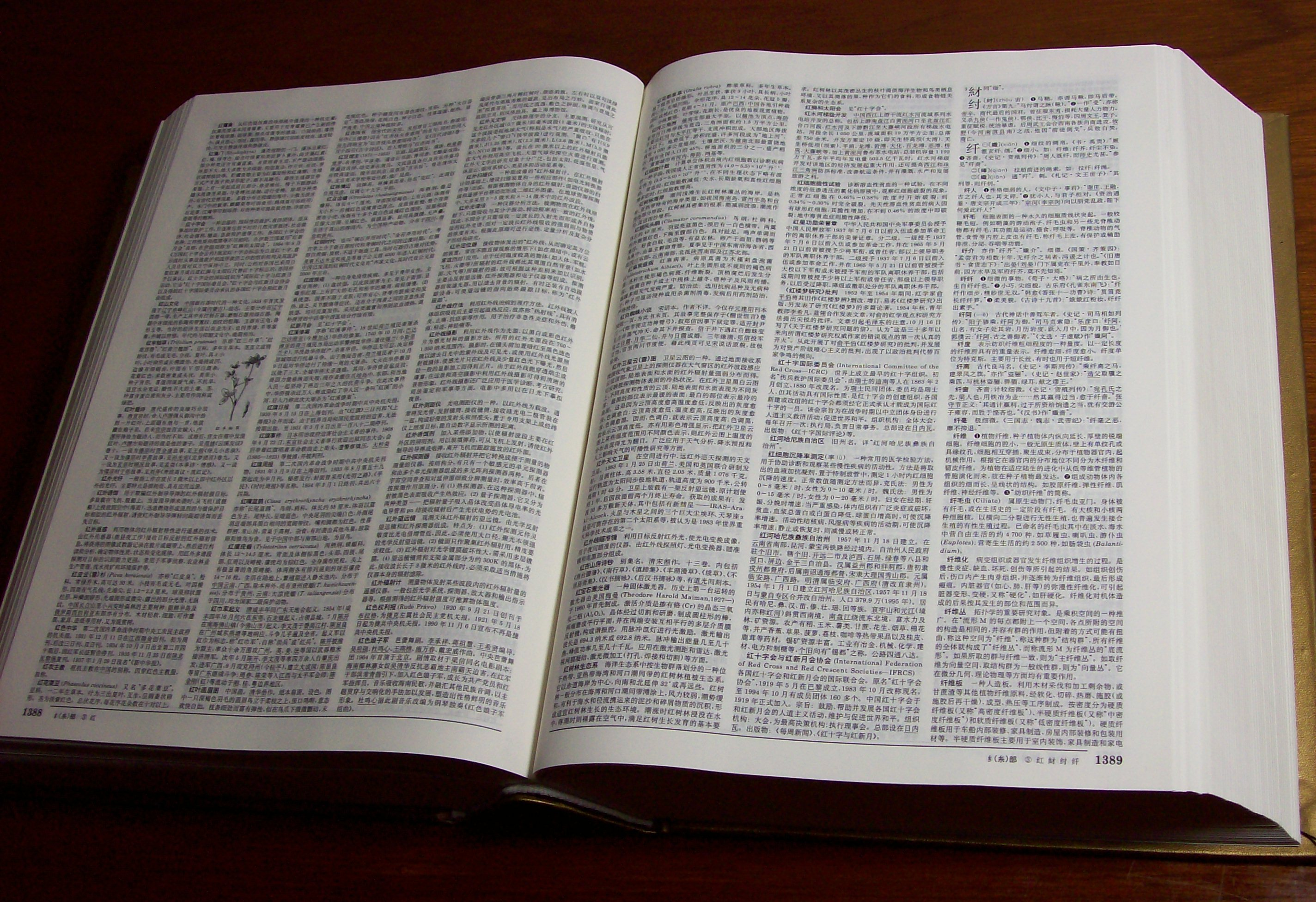
1999 compact fourth edition Cihai

The 1999 Cihai contains 17,674 head characters, 122,835 entries, totaling more than 19.8 million characters. This fourth edition dictionary added many color tables and illustrations. Arrangement is by radicals and there are stroke-count, four-corner, pinyin, and foreign-language indexes. It was also published in a compact version.

Cihai was consulted in the writing of The First Series of Standardized Forms of Words with Non-standardized Variant Forms.

The 2009 fifth edition Cihai contains more than 127,200 entries, arranged by pinyin, with over 22 million characters total. Chen Zhili replaced Xia Zhengnong as chief editor, and lexicographers deleted about 7,000 entries for outdated terms and added almost 10,000 for neologisms. Volumes 1-4 contain text, with many color illustrations, and Volume 5 contains indexes.

The Dacihai (大辞海 "Great sea of words") is a 38-volume encyclopedia project that began in 2004, and published the first volumes in 2008.

== Publications ==
=== Cihai by Chung Hwa Book Company, Limited ===
- 1st edition
  - Combined edition (辭海(合訂本)) (1947): 1 volume.
  - ? edition (辭海) (1956): 2 volumes.
- 2nd edition (最新增訂本《辭海》/辭海最新增訂本) (1979(1980?)): Added 30,000 entries and phonetic symbols. 3 volumes.
- 3rd edition (辭海續編) (1985): Added 1 million letters. 4 volumes (3+1 supplement).
  - 10th revision (2000–05)
  - 10th revision reprint (2014–01)
  - Wolf skin pattern gold collector edition (狼皮紋金裝典藏版) (ISBN 978-957-43-0192-8): Published in 2015-02-01.

=== Cihai by Chung Hwa Book Company (Hong Kong) Limited ===
- 1st edition
  - Combined edition (辭海(合訂本)) (ISBN 962-231-005-2/ISBN 978-962-231-005-6): Based on the combined edition by the original publisher, but without the unit conversion section in the appendix. 1 volume.
    - ?th impression (1994-09-01, 1996-01-04, 1996-04-??, 2000-09-01, 2005-05-01)
- 2nd edition
  - Cihai 1965 new edition (辭海一九六五年新編本) (1979–02): Based on the 1965 draft. It is also printed in simplified Chinese as the 1965 draft. 2 volumes.
- 4th edition (1989)
  - Simplified Chinese 3-volume edition (1989–09): Based on the 4th edition from Shanghai Lexicographical Publishing House, for Hong Kong market.
  - Simplified Chinese condensed edition (1989–09): Based on the 4th edition from Shanghai Lexicographical Publishing House, for Hong Kong market.
- 3rd edition
  - Cihai 1989 condensed edition (辭海1989年縮印本) (ISBN 962-231-017-6/ISBN 978-962-231-017-9) (1990–12): Based on the 3rd edition by Shanghai Lexicographical Publishing House. It is also printed in simplified Chinese as the original. 1 volume.
  - 3-volume edition (辭海 三卷本 1989年簡體字版) (ISBN 962-231-015-X/ISBN 978-962-231-015-5) (1989–01)

=== Cihai by New Star Press ===
- 1st edition
  - Laocihai 1936 (老辞海1936原大影印典藏版) (ISBN 751331758-5/ISBN 978-751331758-0) (2015-10-01): A photocopy reprint of 1st edition Cihai originally published between 1936-11 and 1937–8. 5 volumes.

=== Cihai by Zhonghua Book Company ===
- 1st edition
  - Cihai (辭海) (ISBN 710100454-7/ISBN 978-710100454-0): Photocopied, revised and condensed reprint of the 1936 original. 2 volumes.
    - ?th impression (1981-01-01)
    - ?th impression (1994-07-??)
- 2nd edition
  - Test edition (《辭海》試行本) (1961-09-1961-11): 16 volumes.
    - Language and words (《語詞》): 2 volumes.
    - Philosophy (《哲學》)
    - Economy (《經濟》)
    - Politics and law (《政治法律》)
    - International (《國際》)
    - Race and religion (《民族、宗教》)
    - Culture and education (《文化、教育》)
    - History (《歷史》)
    - Geography (《地理》)
    - Literature and language (《文學、語言文字》)
    - Arts (《藝術》)
    - Natural science 1 (《自然科學（1）》)
    - Natural science 2 (《自然科學（2）》)
    - Agriculture (《農業》)
    - Medicine and health (《醫藥衛生》)
    - Engineering and technology (《工程技術》)
    - index? (《總詞目》) (1962–04):
  - Draft edition (《辭海》未定稿) (1965–04): An internally published draft based on the 1963 internal publication. 2 volumes.

=== Cihai by Shanghai Lexicographical Publishing House ===
- 3rd edition (1979)
  - 1979 script edition (辭海一九七九年定稿本) (1979–09): 3 volumes.
  - 1979 supplement edition (辭海（一九七九年版增訂本）) (1983–12):
  - Small print edition (缩印本) (1980–08): 1 volume.
  - Supplemental vocabulary edition (《辭海》語詞增補本) (1982–12):
  - Supplemental encyclopaedia edition (《辭海》百科增補本) (1982–12):
  - Four-corner index (《辭海》四角號碼查字索引本) (1982–08): A four-corner index for Cihai.
  - Supplemental edition (《辭海》增補本) (1983–12): A compilation of the previously published vocabulary and encyclopaedia supplements.
  - Encyclopaedia index (《辭海》百科詞目分類索引) (1986–10):
  - 2nd new edition (《辭海》分冊新二版) (1986-8-1989-10): 26 volumes.
  - Cihai language and word volume (辞海 语词分册): 1 volume.
    - 1st impression (1977-11-??)
    - 4th impression (1981-10-??)
- 4th edition (1989)
  - 3-volume edition (ISBN 7-5326-0083-1) (1989)
  - Small print edition (辞海 缩印本・1989年版/辞海(1989年版) 缩印本) (ISBN 978-7-5326-0325-1) (1991–01, 1994-09-01): 1 volume.
  - Supplemental edition (增補本) (1995–12):
- 5th edition (1999)
  - Illustrated edition (1999版彩图本) (ISBN 978-7-5326-0523-1) (1999–09): A version with coloured pictures. Sorted by radicals. 5 volumes (4+1 index).
  - Illustrated collectors' edition (彩图珍藏本) (1999–09): A version with coloured pictures. Sorted by radicals. 9 volumes.
  - Illustrated concise edition (彩图缩印本) (2001–08): A version with coloured pictures. Sorted by phonetics. 5 volumes (4+1 index).
  - Small print edition (辞海 缩印本音序) (ISBN 7-5326-0839-5/ISBN 978-7-5326-0839-3) (2002-01-01): Sorted by phonetics. 1 volume.
  - Popular edition (辞海1999年版普及本) (ISBN 978-7-5326-0574-3): Sorted by radicals. 3 volumes. Includes 19,485 characters with 17,674 head characters, 122,835 entries.
    - ?th impression (1999–09)
    - ?th impression (2002-??)
  - Popular edition (辞海1999年版普及本 音序) (ISBN 7-5326-0906-5/ISBN 978-7-5326-0906-2): Sorted by phonetics. 4 volumes (3+1 index).
    - ?th impression (1999-??)
    - ?th impression (2002-08-01)
  - Small print edition (1999年版 【缩印本】 辞海) (2000–01): Sorted by radicals. 1 volume.
  - Small print edition (1999年版 【缩印本】 辞海) (2002–01): Sorted by phonetics. 1 volume.
  - Cihai language and word volume/Cihaiyucifence: Includes 19,485 characters with 17,674 head characters, 122,835 entries. Sorted by phonetics.
    - 1-volume edition (辞海 语词 分册 (音序本)) (ISBN 7-5326-1233-3/ISBN 978-7-5326-1233-8): Sorted by phonetics. 1 volume.
      - ?th impression (2003-04-01)
      - ?th impression (2003-06-01)
    - 3-volume edition (辞海 语词分册) (ISBN 7-5326-1153-1/ISBN 978-7-5326-1153-9): 3 volumes.
      - ?th impression (2003-04-01)
      - 7th impression (2009-12-01)
- 6th edition (2009–10)
  - Collectors' edition (辞海 第六版 典藏本) (ISBN 978-7-5326-3353-1/N.68): The last print edition of Cihai from the publisher. Sorted by Chinese phonetics, followed by Arabic numbers and foreign alphabets. 9 volumes (8+1 index).
    - ?th impression (2011-08-01)
    - ?th impression (2011-09-??)
  - Popular edition (第六版 《辞海》 普及本)/Ci Hai (ISBN 7-5326-3105-2/ISBN 978-7-5326-3105-6/N.66): Edited every 10 years. Sorted by phonetics. 3 volumes.
    - 1st impression (2010-08-01)
  - Small print edition (辞海 第六版 缩印本)/Cihai (ISBN 978-7-5326-3047-9): Sorted by phonetics. 1 volume.
    - ?th impression (2010-04-01)
  - Illustrated edition (辞海 第六版 彩图本) (ISBN 978-7-5326-2859-9): A version with coloured pictures. Sorted by phonetics. 5 volumes (4+1 index).
    - ?th impression (2009-09-??)
    - ?th impression (2010-05-??)

=== Cihai edition dictionaries by Shanghai Lexicographical Publishing House ===
Cihai edition dictionaries are specialized dictionaries for languages.

  - Gudaihanyudacidian: It is a dictionary for old Chinese language, based on the Cihai language and word volume. 1 volume.
    - ?th edition
      - ?th impression (2000-01-01)
    - New 1st edition (辞海版 古代漢語大詞典 新一版) (ISBN 7-5326-2185-5/ISBN 978-7-5326-2185-9)
      - ?th impression (2007-01-01)
      - ?th impression (2007-05-01)
      - ?th impression (2008-02-??)
  - Guhanyuzidian: It is an updated and abridged version of Guhanyudacidian (Gudaihanyudacidian?).
    - New 1st edition (辞海版 古汉语字典 【新一版】) (ISBN 7-5326-2342-4/ISBN 978-7-5326-2342-6): Includes about 17,000 entries. 1 volume.
      - ?th impression (2009-05-01)
  - Changyongsuyucidian: It is a dictionary for colloquial terms.
    - 1st edition (辞海版 常用俗语辞典) (ISBN 978-7-5326-4067-6/H.572): Includes 4300 entries. 1 volume.
      - 1st impression (2014-04-01)
  - common famous quotes dictionary (辞海版 常用名句辭典) (ISBN 978-7-5326-4022-5): 1 volume.
    - ?th impression (2014-04-??)
  - common idiom dictionary (辞海版 常用諺語辭典) (ISBN 978-7-5326-4039-3): 1 volume.
    - ?th impression (2014-02-??)
  - common back-revealing dictionary (辞海版 常用歇後語辭典) (ISBN 978-7-5326-3985-4): 1 volume.
    - ?th impression (2014-01-??)
  - common expression dictionary (辞海版 常用慣用語辭典) (ISBN 978-7-5326-3996-0): 1 volume.
    - ?th impression (2014-01-??)
  - common etymology dictionary (辞海版 常用典故辭典) (ISBN 978-7-5326-3865-9): 1 volume.
    - ?th impression (2013-08-??)
  - Zhongxue Wenyanwen Changyoungzi Xiangjie Shouce (辞海版 中學文言文常用字詳解手冊) (ISBN 978-7-5326-1799-9): 1 volume.
    - ?th impression (2005-05-??)
  - Xiehouyuxiaocidian: Originally a separate dictionary, but became part of Cihai edition collection during reprints.
    - 1st edition: Includes over 2000 entries.
      - Xie Hou Yu Xiao Ci Dian (歇后语小词典) (ISBN 7-5326-0608-2/H.64): 1 volume.
        - 1st impression (2001-01-01)
      - Xiehouyu Xiao Cidian (辞海版 歇后语小词典 新一版) (ISBN 7-5326-1614-2/H.221, ISBN 978-7-5326-1614-5): 1 volume. Changes include enlarged print and paperback.
        - 1st impression (2004-07-01)
      - Xiehouyuxiaocidian (歇后语 小词典) (ISBN 7-5326-1957-5/H.267): 1 volume. It was reprinted as part of student book bag engineering (学生书包工程) collection. Changes include condensed print.
        - 1st impression (2006-01-01)
    - 2nd edition: Includes 5300 entries (with sub-entries).
      - Xiehouyuxiaocidian (歇后语 小词典) (ISBN 978-7-5326-2489-8/H.349): 1 volume.
        - 1st impression (2009-01-01)
      - Bi-colour edition (辞海版 新课标 学生书包工程(双色版) 歇后语 小词典) (ISBN 978-7-5326-2752-3): 1 volume. Changes include enlarged print over previous reprint, introduction of bi-colour contents.
        - 1st impression (2010-01-01)
  - Tongyici Xiao Cidian (辞海版 同義詞小詞典) (ISBN 978-7-5326-1616-9): 1 volume.
    - New 1st edition (新一版)
      - ?th impression (2004-07-??)
  - Chengyu Xiao Cidian (辞海版 成語小詞典) (ISBN 978-7-5326-1613-8): 1 volume.
    - New 1st edition (新一版)
      - ?th impression (2004-07-??)
  - Guanyongyu Xiao Cidian (辞海版 慣用語小詞典) (ISBN 978-7-5326-1617-6): 1 volume.
    - New 1st edition (新一版)
      - ?th impression (2004-07-??)
  - Zuci Xiao Cidian (辞海版 組詞小詞典) (ISBN 978-7-5326-1620-6): 1 volume.
    - New 1st edition (新一版)
      - ?th impression (2004-07-??)
  - Fanyici Xiao Cidian (辞海版 反義詞小詞典) (ISBN 978-7-5326-1619-0): 1 volume.
    - New 1st edition (新一版)
      - ?th impression (2004-07-??)
  - Zhongguo Yanyu Daquan (辞海版 中國諺語大全) (ISBN 978-7-5326-1534-6): 2 volumes.
    - ? edition
    - ?th impression (2004-05-??)
  - Zhongguo Xiehouyu Daquan (辞海版 中國歇後語大全) (ISBN 978-7-5326-1535-3): 1 volume.
    - ? edition
    - ?th impression (2004-05-??)
  - Zhongguo Guanyongyu Daquan (辞海版 中國慣用語大全) (ISBN 978-7-5326-1533-9): 1 volume.
    - ? edition
    - ?th impression (2004-05-??)
  - Zhongguosuyudacidian
    - 1st edition: Includes 15,000 entries.
      - New first edition (辞海版 中国俗语大辞典 新一版) (ISBN 978-7-5326-3211-4/H.424): 1 volume.
        - 1st impression (2011-03-01)
      - Compact edition (辞海版 中国俗语大辞典 袖珍本) (ISBN 978-7-5326-3469-9/H.485): 1 volume.
        - 1st impression (2011-08-01)
      - Popular edition (辞海版 中国俗语大辞典 普及本) (ISBN 978-7-5326-3416-3/H.473): 1 volume.
        - 1st impression (2011-08-01)

=== Cihai by Tung Hua Book Co., Ltd. ===
- 4th edition (1989)
  - Traditional Chinese 3-volume edition (ISBN 9576365651/ISBN 9789576365652) (1993–07): Based on the 4th edition from Shanghai Lexicographical Publishing House, for Taiwan market.
  - Traditional Chinese 10-volume edition (1993–07): Based on the 4th edition from Shanghai Lexicographical Publishing House, for Taiwan market.
    - China and foreign geography (中外地理辭海) (ISBN 9789576366567) (1993-11-17): Includes general, China, history, foreign nation categories.
    - China and foreign history (中外歷史辭海) (ISBN 9789576366642) (1998-04-11): Includes 10,406 entries in general, China, foreign nation, archaeology categories.
    - Politics and law (政法辭海) (ISBN 9789576366611) (1993-07-01):
    - Education and art (教育文藝辭海) (ISBN 9789576366574) (1993-12-08):
    - Biological science (生命科學辭海) (ISBN 9789576366659) (1998-04-11):
    - Engineering technology (工程技術辭海) (ISBN 9789576366581) (1993-12-08):
    - Philosophy (哲學辭海) (ISBN 9789576366604) (1993-12-08):
    - Sciences (理科辭海) (ISBN 9789576366628) (1993-12-08):
    - Economics (經濟學辭海) (ISBN 9789576366598) (1993-12-08):
    - Language (語詞辭海)/Shanghai edition (語詞辭海(上海版)): Includes over 16,000 head characters, over 56,000 entries.
      - (ISBN 9789576363849) (1993-05-15):
      - Deluxe edition (ISBN 9789576363832) (?-?-?):

=== Cihai by The Commercial Press, Ltd. ===
- 3rd edition (辭海最新增訂本) (ISBN 978-957-43-0192-8): Based on the 3rd edition by Chung Hwa Book Company, Limited. 4 volumes (3+1 supplement).
  - Wolf skin pattern gold collector edition (狼皮紋金裝典藏版): Published in 2015-02-01.

=== Dacihai ===
- Ethnicity 大辞海(民族卷)
- Art (大辞海：美术卷)
- Chinese geography (大辞海：中国地理卷)
- Life sciences (大辞海(生命科学卷))
- World history (大辞海·世界历史卷)
- Drama and film (大辞海・戏剧电影卷)
- Construction (大辞海・建筑水利卷)
- Management (大辞海・管理学卷)
- Words and phrases (大辞海·语词卷)
- Political sciences (大辞海・政治学社会学卷)
- Chemical industries and textiles (大辞海：化工轻工纺织卷)
- Military (大辞海(军事卷))
- Mechanics and electrical (大辞海*机械电气卷)
- Linguistics (大辞海·语言学卷 (修订版)) (ISBN 978-7-5326-3855-0)
  - ?th impression (2013-12-??)
- Religion (大辞海·宗教卷) (ISBN 978-7-5326-4053-9)
  - ?th impression (2014-01-??)
- Energy sciences (大辞海·能源科学卷) (ISBN 978-7-5326-4023-2)
  - ?th impression (2014-01-??)

== Lawsuit ==
After Tung Hua Book Co., Ltd. had published Cihai from Shanghai Lexicographical Publishing House, Chung Hwa Book Company, Limited requested Tung Hua Book not to use 'Cihai' as book title to avoid trademark violation. The Taiwan-based Chung Hwa Book Company, Limited already registered 'Cihai' as trademark for printed material in 1985 prior to THB's publication, but the book's content was licensed from Shanghai Lexicographical Publishing House, whom had authorized the use of contents to THB.
