= Xiandai Hanyu Guifan Cidian =

Chinese dictionary

- Xiandai Hanyu Guifan Cidian, 2nd edition
- Language: Chinese
- Genre: Dictionary
- Publisher: Foreign Language Teaching and Research Press
- Publication date: January 2004 (original version); May 2014 (3rd edition); June 2022 (4th edition)
- Publication place: China
- Pages: 1,930 pages
- ISBN: 978-7-5213-3569-9

Xiandai Hanyu Guifan Cidian (simplified Chinese: 现代汉语规范词典; traditional Chinese: 現代漢語規範詞典; pinyin: Xiàndài Hànyǔ Guīfàn Cídiǎn; lit. ''Contemporary Chinese Standard Dictionary' or 'A Standard Dictionary of Contemporary Chinese'') is a dictionary of Standard Chinese created as part of a proposal in the Eighth Five-year Plan of China. It is similar to Xiandai Hanyu Cidian, but with notable divergences. The third edition has entries for 12,000 characters and 72,000 words, with over 80,000 example usages.

== Editions ==
Edition	Release date	Number of entries	ISBN
(original)	January 2004		ISBN 7-5600-3975-8
2nd	March 2010	70,000+	ISBN 978-7-5600-9518-9
3rd	May 2014	72,000+	ISBN 978-7-5135-4562-4
4th	June 2022	72,000+	ISBN 978-7-5213-3569-9

== History ==
In 2004, two million copies of the first edition of Xiandai Hanyu Guifan Cidian were printed. In March 2004, Jiang Lansheng and other twelve members of the 1st Plenary Session of the 10th CPPCC National Committee submitted a proposal titled 《辞书应慎用"规范"冠名》 (Literally: dictionaries ought to use the word "standard" (规范, guīfàn) in their titles more prudently). The document stated that Xiandai Hanyu Cidian was in full compliance with the nation's linguistic standards and questioned the naming of and the overall editorial quality of the new Xiandai Hanyu Guifan Cidian. Some of the argumentation was derived from the book 《拯救辞书——规范辨正、质量管窥及学术道德考量》.

The 2010 second edition includes 70,000 entries and 80,000 example usages. Among the 2,600 new definitions and new words added in the second edition were '微博' ('Weibo'), '低碳经济' ('Low-carbon economy') and others.

Publishing of the third edition was announced on 26 August 2014. The dictionary was the first to be written according to the standard of the List of Commonly Used Standard Chinese Characters. The third edition added new definitions for some words. For example, '土豪' was newly defined as 'new rich'. In the 'Additions Part 1: Single Character Entries' section of the dictionary, new entries for four hundred relatively rarely used characters from the List of Commonly Used Standard Chinese Characters were added, including entries for '鲿' ('codfish'), '玃' (a literary term for monkeys) and others. New entries included in the 'Additions Part 2: Multi-syllable Entries' section of the third edition include '微信' ('WeChat'), '吐槽' ('to whine') and others. The third edition includes 5,500 notes appended to various word and character entries that point out common mistakes and non-standard usages among Mandarin Chinese. These notes were created in part through a review of common errors in Gaokao examination papers.

A fourth edition was released in 2022.
