= V-chip =

Censorship technology based on parental guidance ratings

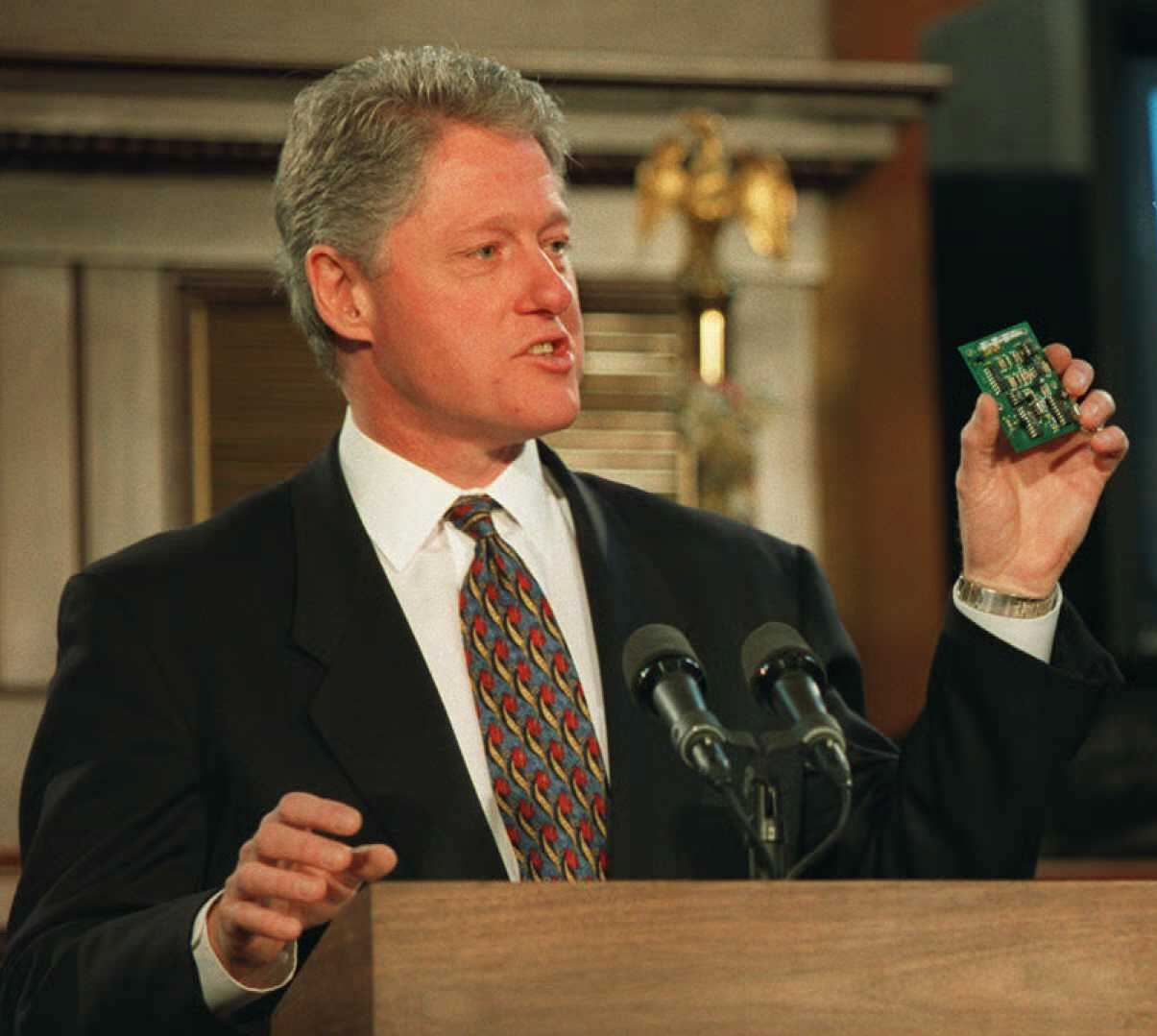
U.S. President Bill Clinton holding a printed circuit board containing a prototype V-chip module in 1996

V-chip is a technology used in television set receivers in Canada, Mexico, Brazil, and the United States, that allows the blocking of programs based on their ratings category. It is intended for use by parents to manage their children's television viewing based on blocking systems. Televisions manufactured for the United States market since January 2000 are required to have the V-chip technology. Since the idea for blocking programs in this way was patented and tested in Canada by Brett West and John P. Gardner in 1994, the device remains in use into the age of digital television, however it only blocks programming from standard cable and broadcast television and does not block news, sportscasting, movies on premium cable channels, or streamed programs via the internet.

Analog V-chip technology works much like closed captioning and uses the vertical blanking interval in the television signal. The system receives a special code in the broadcast signal that indicates the show's score according to a simple numerical rating system for violence, sex, and language. The programs' signals are encoded based on their rating, on line 21 of the broadcast signal's vertical blanking interval using the XDS protocol, and this is detected by the television set's V-chip. If the program rating is outside the level configured as acceptable on that particular television, the program will be blocked. The V-chip does not block infomercial, news or sportscasts, which are unrated.

The V-chip has a four-digit numerical password in order to keep older children from changing its settings. The V-chip can be overridden by anyone who reads the television's instruction and finds out how to reset the password to 0000 (built into the V-chip in case the parents themselves forget the password that they set).

The phrase "V-chip" was purportedly coined by then-Representative Ed Markey of Massachusetts. According to him the "V" stands for "violence". By contrast, in an interview with Tim Collings, one of the people who claim to have invented the device, he said that it was intended to stand for "viewer control".

== History ==
In 1975, the Family Viewing Hour was introduced in the United States, in which broadcasters had to play TV content suitable for all ages. This idea was quickly abandoned because broadcasters felt it violated their First Amendment rights by restricting what content they could play. The inventor of the V-chip technology originally meant for it to be a simple tool that parents could use to restrict their children's television viewing. He did not expect it would become a national standard for all televisions.

== Implementation ==
In 1993, Keith Spicer met with top American executives and disclosed information about the V-Chip Technology. "Tim Collings' creation holds promise in the future of the television industry, and the more exposure achieved, the more nations are able to benefit." Discussions took place about the increasing amount of violence on TV and the importance of monitoring and blocking shows. This sparked interest, but no steps were taken for implementation. In 1994 the technology was presented at a Violence on TV conference in France and later again at a conference in Belgium. This is where Al Gore first became familiarized with the concept of the V-Chip and the exposure helped him to advise Bill Clinton, which led to the decision to pass the Telecommunications Act of 1996. Once the V-Chip gained the ability to block multiple shows at the same time interest in the technology expanded significantly. In January 1998 exclusive rights to the V-Chip were sold to Tri-Vision Electronics Inc.

== Forces leading to development ==
=== Scientific-technical ===
While at Colombia College, Joseph N. Jackson created the idea for a programmable device that could block viewing at certain times. This eventually became the precursor to the V-chip. In Canada in the early 1990s, studies on the possible effects of television on violence were conducted by the Canadian Radio-Television Commission, a committee of Parliament, and Heritage Canada. The reports all concluded that violence on television in Canada was a serious problem.

The V-chip gained popularity when it was revealed at a Technology Exposition at the G7 meetings in Brussels in 1995.

=== Political ===
One of the driving forces of the development of the V-chip was the signing of the Telecommunications Act of 1996 by President Bill Clinton. The television industry was given the opportunity to establish ratings for its programming. The act also ordered that half of all television sets at least 13″ after July 1, 1999, had to have the V-chip installed and that all television sets at least 13″ after January 1, 2000, had to have it installed. In addition, the Federal Communications Commission supported the act and worked to enforce it.

== The Telecommunications Act ==
The V-chip was an added provision in Bill Clinton's Telecommunications Act of 1996. He said, "If every parent uses this chip wisely, it can become a powerful voice against teen violence, teen pregnancy, teen drug use, and for both learning and entertainment," as he signed the law on February 8, 1996. "We're handing the TV remote control back to America's parents so that they can pass on their values and protect their children." The addition of the V-chip into the Telecommunications Act was helpful to attract American voters for the 1996 Clinton-Gore campaign.

The portion of the overall act that affects the V-chip is of Title V. This section, "Obscenity and Violence," addresses the influence parents may have over their children's viewing capabilities on cable television. Section 551, Parental Choice in Television Programming, outlines the effects that violence has on the youth of a nation and addresses how parents should exercise the control to limit and/or block what information their children are in fact viewing and what is being broadcast into their private homes. Also addressed is the inclusion of the implementation of a rating code for violence within television programming. Parents should be informed of the content of a program prior to its airing so that appropriate precautions may be made to protect their children from said material. The V-Chip technology would be employed in such an event.

== Ratings ==
In 1996, the United States Congress decreed that the television industry should create a voluntary rating system for its shows called the TV parental guidelines. Three main associations (the National Association of Broadcasters, the National Cable Television Association, and the Motion Picture Association of America) would establish this rating system. Along with the three founding associations, the chairman of the FCC would select five members of the advocacy community to participate in establishing television ratings. Altogether the FCC chairman, six members from each broadcasting industry and the five non-industry members make up a total of 24 participants. These ratings are the icons that appear in the corner of the television screen at the beginning of every show and after each commercial break for many broadcasters. These ratings include TV-Y, TV-Y7, TV-Y7-FV, TV-G, TV-PG, TV-14, and TV-MA.

TV-Y includes all television programs designed to be appropriate for all children. TV-Y7 programs are directed to older children, specifically aged 7 and above. TV-Y7-FV programs are also directed to older children aged 7 and above with the addition that this rating denotes fantasy or animated violence. TV-G includes programs appropriate for all ages because it contains little to no violence, no strong language, and little to no sexual situations. TV-PG programs may include materials that parents may find unsuitable, including moderate violence, some sexual situations, or infrequent coarse language. TV-14 programs have parents strongly cautioned for materials unsuitable for children under 14 years of age. Finally, TV-MA programs are specifically designed to be viewed by adults aged 17 and up.

== Invention and patent ==
=== Invention ===
Tim Collings states he developed the V-chip technology while he was an engineering professor at Simon Fraser University in British Columbia, but he did not obtain a patent on the technology.

=== Patent ===
An idea for blocking programs in this way was patented by Brett West and John P. Gardner in 1994 and tested in Canada. The patent was number 5,550,575. Two others separately patented devices similar or identical to the V-chip: John Olivo of Parental Guide of Omaha, and an Air Force captain by the name of Carl Elam. Collings, Olivo, and Elam all claim to have invented the technology.

== Criticisms ==
=== Usage ===
On April 25, 2007, the Federal Communications Commission released a report entitled In the Matter of Violent Television Programming And Its Impact On Children. The report discusses the low usage of V-chip technology. In its analysis, the report addresses the following studies:

According to a 2003 study, parents' low level of V-chip use is explained in part by their unawareness of the device and the "multi-step and often confusing process" necessary to use it. Only 27% of all parents in the study group could figure out how to program the V-chip, and many parents "who might otherwise have used the V-Chip were frustrated by an inability to get it to work properly."

The Kaiser Family Foundation conducted a telephone survey in 2004 of 1,001 parents of children ages 2–17. The results of that survey showed:

- 15% of all parents had used the V-chip
- 26% of all parents had not bought a new television set since January 2000, when the V-chip was first required in all televisions
- 39% of all parents had bought a new television set since January 2000, but did not think it even included a V-chip
- 20% of all parents knew they had a V-chip, but had not used it.

A March 2007 Zogby poll indicated, among other things, that 88% of respondents did not use a V-chip or cable box parental controls in the previous week, leading the Parents Television Council to call the television industry's V-chip education campaign a failure. This poll did not measure whether parents were aware of the V-chip and chose not to use it.

The networks feared that a single profanity would block an entire program. They also feared that they would lose advertising revenue because advertisers would not pay for time slots during programs that might be blocked.

=== Lack of supporting research ===
The American Civil Liberties Union argues, "Research has not proven that watching violence on television causes watchers to commit violence" citing the Federal Trade Commission's Marketing Violent Entertainment to Children: A Review of the Self-Regulation and Industry Practices in the Motion Picture, Music Recording, & Electronic Game Industries report in September 2001 as support. In ACLU's website, ACLU quoted the FTC in saying, "Most researchers and investigators agree that exposure to media violence alone does not cause a child to commit a violent act, and that it is not the sole, or even the most important, factor in contributing to youth aggression, anti-social attitudes, and violence."

According to J.M. Balkin, author of Media Filters and the V-Chip, people "want to filter out dangerous ideas and views they do not agree with or expressions that offend and anger them." There is also cultural and familial differences; an action, activity, or behavior may be deemed as "appropriate" for one culture or for one family but may very well be considered "inappropriate" for another culture or for another family. Balkin says some people believe that the use of the V-chip is a way for the government to "intervene and impose binding moral standards" on others.

=== Expenses ===
While the V-chip is fairly inexpensive to add to individual television sets, a large amount of money has been spent educating people on the technology. $550 million was spent to educate parents on the V-chip, but they are no more aware of the technology or the ways in which it can be put to use now than they were before the funds were spent.

=== Infringement on rights ===
Another argument brought up is that it is not the government's right to monitor or censor what viewers watch on television. According to this argument, because the government regulates the rating system, it is also regulating much of parents' decision making processes on their children's viewing habits. Caroline Fredrickson, of the American Civil Liberties Union, stated, "These FCC recommendations are political pandering. The government should not replace parents as decision makers in America's living rooms. There are some things that the government does well. But deciding what is aired and when on television is not one of them."

=== Insufficient number of users ===
Despite the amount that has been spent on educating parents on use of the V-chip, there is still a low proportion of users. Of parents who have access to the V-chip, just 20% actually use it. As reported in 2007, 52% of parents who had access to the V-chip were unaware of its existence, and 27% of parents who knew of the V-chip's existence opted not to try it. Tim Winters, the Executive director for the Parents Television Council stated, "What I see is a solution that's flawed at every level. Conceptually, it's not bad, but practically, it's abhorrent."

From 1999 to 2001, a research study was conducted at the University of Pennsylvania Annenberg Public Policy Center to observe the use of the V-chip in family households. The study was conducted on a total of 150 families with children between the ages of 7 and 10 who had V-chip television sets in their homes. Over the course of a year, families' use of the V-chip technology was observed to draw conclusions about the overall use of the V-chip in family environments.

Three experimental groups (High Information, Low Information, Control Group) were used to determine how crucial pre-emptive training and informational sessions on the V-chip were to their actual use. The first group was given a new TV, equipped with V-chip technology, and detailed information about the V-chip. The second group was also given a new TV equipped with V-chip technology but no special training on the V-chip. The control group was not given a new TV or special training but was followed over the same time period to observe their V-chip use.

Overall, the study found this:

- Only 33 out of 110 families (30%) who received a new television set with V-chip technology programmed it during the course of the study
- Of those 33 families, only nine families (8%) regularly used the technology
- 24 out of 110 families (22%) tried the device at some point but didn't use it through the year either through choice or because they did not understand how to use the V-chip
- 77 families (70%) never used the V-chip technology at all during the year study

Many families either had no idea that their television possessed a V-chip or gave up after struggling to program it. Even families who were given extensive information on the V-chip still opted to not use the technology. Overall, this study suggests that there are an insufficient number of households that implement the V-chip technology.

== Support ==
While a lot of controversies have been sparked by the V-chip, what sets it apart from other issues is that the V-chip imposes no government constraints on television programming itself; it is up to an individual family's discretion to choose which programs to block. When Congressman Ed Markey, chair of the House Telecommunications Subcommittee, introduced the first V-chip legislation, he told the press that parents "will be given the power to send a message directly to the industry. The government will not be involved."

=== Parental responsibility ===
While the U.S. Federal Communications Commission (FCC) and Parents Television Council (PTC) research has shown low percentages in parental involvement in television viewing control, Television Watch, a Charleston, South Carolina-based organization advocating the use of parental controls like the V-chip, has consistently found otherwise in its research. They found in June 2007 that the majority of parents personally monitor their children's television viewing in some way, whether through use of the V-chip or other means. TV Watch has also found that most parents know that they have the option of the V-chip or other parental controls to monitor their children's television viewing, and believe it is primarily their responsibility, not that of the government, to protect children from inappropriate content on television.

In response to the PTC survey on the V-chip that claimed the device's failure, TV Watch maintains that the survey was "flawed by faulty analysis and biased methodology". TV Watch also participated in a Kaiser Family Foundation forum in June 2007, based on recent Kaiser research, which claims that most parents do monitor their children's television viewing, whether or not by means of the V-chip.

=== Expenses ===
In March 1998, The Washington Times reported that the V-chip was envisioned to be inexpensive. A V-chip decoder for existing sets was reckoned between $5–10 (though it was not readily available in the consumer market). Since 2000, every television set with screens of 13″ or larger has required V-chip techonolgy as part of the set, and over time became a low-cost part of most television operating systems, even for sets under 13".

=== Ease of monitoring for parents ===
The TV ratings system is designed to aid parents in deciding what programming they deem appropriate for their children to watch. One such site that explains the ratings system is TheTVBoss.org, which was created by the United States Ad Council. The website explains the various options for controlling children's viewing patterns. It also contains instructions for activating the chip.

=== Support from PTA groups ===
Many parents' groups are in favor of monitoring children's viewing habits, mostly for the purpose of building family values. "America's families will be now the ultimate judges of [the new ratings system's] effectiveness," said Lois Joan White, Parent-Teacher Association president, in 1997 in support of V-chip technology. The V-chip is also supported by other websites like FamilySafeMedia.com, which presents technologies like the Weemote and TVGuardian as alternatives to the V-chip.

== The V-chip and commercials ==
The V-chip has provided parents and guardians the ability to monitor and block television shows that are unfavorable for children to watch in specific households by reading the information that is encoded in the rated program and blocking it based upon that rating it has been given. Due to the increasing variety of technology that is being developed and used in the household, however, parents are concerned that their children will be exposed to the same content they are trying to block through unrated commercials. Because commercials are not rated, the V-chip does not have the ability to censor lewd or inappropriate commercials. This raises issues because children can see the same content that they are blocked on regular shows while watching commercials. This causes the V-Chip to be ineffective unless it applies to both television programs as well as commercials.

Because rating commercials globally would be a difficult task, a possible suggestion would be to limit inappropriate commercials and promotions shown at certain times that children watch television. In order to give children some protection from seeing inappropriate commercials, certain improvements to the V-Chip should be made that can follow the same standard across all areas of media that include "broadcast, cable, satellite, DVRs and, to the extent possible, the Internet."

== See also ==
- Analog television
- Analog transmission
- Censorship
- Motion picture rating system
- Parental controls
- Production Code
- Re-edited film
- South Park: Bigger, Longer & Uncut
- Television content rating systems
