= EIA-608 =

Analog television closed captioning standard

EIA-608 captioning (green arrow) appears as a series of white lines and dots that flash occasionally, as seen in this animated image.

EIA-608, also known as line 21 captions or CEA-608, is a standard used for displaying closed captioning (CC) on analog NTSC television broadcasts in the United States, Canada, and Mexico. Developed by the now defunct Electronic Industries Alliance (EIA), it allows text such as dialogue and sound effects to be shown on screen to aid deaf or hard of hearing viewers in following television programs. EIA-608 was tightly connected to the NTSC broadcasting standard. As such, the transition to the digital ATSC standard (or other competing digital standards) in North America has rendered 608 obsolete in active broadcasting. Its digital successor, EIA-708 or CTA-708, is intended to take over in areas where ATSC is used. As a subtitle format, EIA-608 captioning is classified as a closed, analog, in-band (transmitted inside the video stream), and text-based protocol (the latter contrasts with bitmap images of the caption characters, as seen on DVDs).

The system works by sending the caption data on a part of the TV signal that viewers aren't intended to see under normal operating conditions, called the vertical blanking interval (VBI). When broadcasting NTSC signals, the size of the "image" transmitted is larger than the actual display, creating an area (the VBI) that is intentionally invisible to the viewer. The VBI exists as an "imaginary" extended region above the screen (there also exists another section below the screen, but it is not relevant to EIA-608). There are many horizontal lines within the invisible regions that can be used for the transmission of non-video data. Line 21 was selected for "transmission, reception, and display of caption data", in addition to generic text information and metadata.

Initially launched in 1980, the standard received US government endorsement after the Television Decoder Circuitry Act (1990) mandated the availability of closed captioning decoding hardware, specifically for the EIA-608 format, by July 1993 on all consumer TVs with screen sizes of at least 13 inches. On the broadcasting side, in 1997, the US Federal Communications Committee rolled out new guidelines for a ramp-up to full enforcement of CC availability on all programing, to be achieved by 2006. Both Canada and the US used the ability of EIA-608 to send generic metadata in order to digitise parental controls. Line 21 could contain optional age guidelines and content descriptors in differing formats (e.g. "DLSV"), enabling the interpretation, display, and potential automated age restriction (e.g. the US V-chip system) of content.

Although originally developed for captioning (and short plain text messages and metadata, such as the parental control data), the standard was also to be extensible and an all-purpose metadata carrier, similar to and inspired by Teletext, which had been invented almost a decade earlier in the UK. Teletext used the same manipulation of the VBI and rapidly spread throughout Europe, where it became a cultural institution. EIA-608 grew to support some limited extra services, known as "eXtended Data Services" (XDS, rendered "eXtended" in official documentation), which included details about program titles or instructions for recording shows (i.e. durations and start or stop signals for overruns). EIA-608 is a basic analog emulation of some of the features found in later DVR systems, set-top boxes, and other equipment offered by digital TV providers, cable (and satellite) providers, and later still by "smart TVs". For example, the addition of program titles and durations was a precursor to modern electronic program guides. Teletext, however, was able to provide program listings as early as 1974 with the full rollout of the BBC's Ceefax.

The specification has been subsumed by the American National Standards Institute and the latest version is entitled Line 21 Data Services (ANSI/CTA-608-E S-2019), which began work in 2008 and was finalized in 2019. It is unclear whether there will be another version given that, as of 2022, all three countries have completely finished their transition to all-digital TV and thus EIA-608 is obsolete as a broadcast protocol. However, there is still a lot of legacy media with CCs in various versions of the 608 format encoded into their video streams.

== Description ==
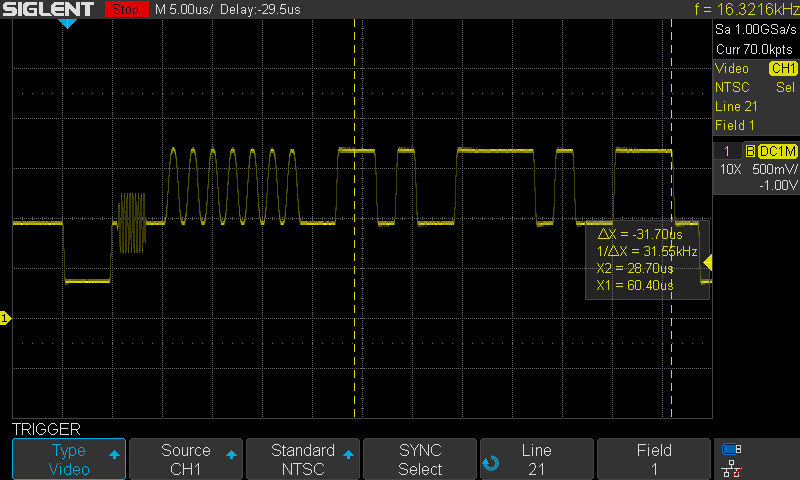
EIA 608 closed caption data on an NTSC analog television signal, as seen in this oscilloscope still.

Interlaced video is divided into even and odd fields (see the interlacing article for a more technical discussion of fields). For simplicity, a field is comparable to a single frame of video as seen by the viewer. These fields received by the display (e.g. TV) are larger than the display and thus have regions that are not, and are not intended to be, visible to the viewer. It is these invisible regions that contain special non-video data, including EIA-608 captions (in addition to metadata about caption availability and other information unrelated to captioning such as XDS, partially allowing analog broadcasts to emulate some features of digital broadcasting).

EIA-608 captions are transmitted inside the invisible line 21 (interlaced NTSC video draws horizontal lines counted from the top, with an "imaginary" portion above the top of the screen for these non-visible lines). With captions enabled, the viewer sees either the data encoded into the odd fields of a broadcast or sees the data in the even fields, but not both. This is so that both sets of fields (odd and even) may be used to broadcast multiple different sets of captions. According to the standard, the odd field captions should relate to the primary audio track and the even field captions should, if present, relate to the second audio program (SAP), which is usually a translation (e.g. dub) of the primary audio. In analog broadcasting, SAP was commonly used in America for Spanish translations of English shows and in Canada to provide both official languages (i.e. English and French). The 608 standard theoretically provided for four different streams of captions (which can still be seen currently when viewing video with 608 captions available in software like VLC) but, in practice, had an upper bound of two sets (see Channels section).

608 captions are transmitted with a parity bit (i.e. a basic check to ensure likely accuracy of the captions) which is also in the non-visible video data area of NTSC broadcasts. These may also be present in the picture user data in ATSC transmissions. ATSC is the digital upgrade to NTSC and is currently in common use. ATSC supports EIA-608 encoding, when converted to digital packets, but is intended to use an updated captioning scheme known as CTA-708 or EIA-708.

EIA-608 uses a fixed bandwidth of 480 bit/s per line 21 of each field. This yields a maximum of 32 characters per line and a maximum of four lines per caption (i.e. all characters on screen at any one time) for a 30 frames per second broadcast. Higher frame rates scale linearly with this fixed integer: 60 FPS video is given 960 bits per second for CC, even though this is not functionally useful.

EIA-608 has seen several revisions including the addition of extended character sets to fully support the representation of Spanish, French, German, and a selection of other Western European languages (most of which went largely unused due to the penetration of Teletext and the lack of NTSC in countries where these languages were relevant). EIA-608 was also extended to support two byte characters for the Korean and Japanese markets. The full version of 708 has support for more character sets (targeting Unicode support via UTF-32) and better customization of caption positioning and fonts. Digital TVs cannot natively receive and decode 608 analog signals, though there remains a lot of particularly older shows that are simply aired with original 608 captions converted to the digital 708.

EIA-608 required specialized hardware decoders in order to interpret and display CC signals. In America, these were made mandatory in the 1990s. In the 2020s, all new equipment sold is equipped to read 708 signals. 608 is obsolete as an actual over-the-air broadcast protocol but continues to be relevant due to networks and streaming services et al. distributing their old 608 formatted content in 708 packets, which means that the encoding format and its restrictions and conventions (including all-capital lettering and 7 byte character set) will continue to apply. Raw EIA-608 caption byte pairs, on the other hand, meaning 608 broadcasts, are obsolete due to the complete digital television transition in all three major territories where 608 was used. ATSC broadcasts instead use the EIA-708 protocol, which can either encapsulate EIA-608 captions for older shows or use its new native 708 stream format. According to Adobe, in 2015, an outright majority of "premium content" was simply displaying older 608 formatted captions wrapped up in the newer 708 protocol.

== Channels ==
EIA-608 defines four channels of caption information, so that a program could, for example, have captions in four different languages. There are two channels, called 1 and 2 by the standard, in each of the two fields of a frame. The channels are often presented to users numbered simply as CC1-2 for the odd field and CC3-4 for the even field.

Due to bandwidth limitations on either field, CC1 and CC3 are the only ones used, meaning that there has been little use for the second channel. Early Spanish SAP captioned broadcasts first used the second channel CC2 because the original caption decoders only read the first odd field, but later switched to using CC3 for bandwidth reasons. Due to the same bandwidth reasons XDS was never used by Spanish-speaking stations.

Despite never achieving its goal of four streams of subtitles, the 480 bit aspect of the combined CC signal is fixed in size, meaning that it must be filled with blank space or other filler if any of the four channels are unused. The omnipresence of the four channels may be observed by examining in MediaInfo (or another metadata and media stream reader) any video transport stream containing a recording of a captioned TV program, where it will have four streams, even if the latter three are often empty. These 608 standard subtitles are still sometimes found embedded in web streams of TV programs where streaming services or other video hosts may not have stripped them from the video, even after adding their own subtitles. 608 CCs are encoded into the video steam itself and so are not removed by a simple remux or change of container type.

Within each channel, there are two streams of information which might be considered sub-channels: one carries "captions" and the other "text". The latter is not in common use due to the lack of hardware support and bandwidth available. Text is signaled by the use of text commands and can be used for a formatted URL string with a 16-bit checksum that designates a web site that the captions relate to or a local station communication channel.

This layering is based on the OSI Protocol Reference Model:

CC Layers	OSI Layers	DVB/MXF Layers	Comments
	Application	Interpretation	Issuing commands and appending text to rows
	Presentation	Coding	Breaking up individual commands and characters
	Session	Channel	Channel Byte Stream
	--	Selection	CC channel assembly from CC byte pairs
Injection	Transport	Synchronization	CC byte pairs extracted/synchronized with/from video frames
	Network	unused	directly connected link
	Link		video frames or VBI data split from link format
TV SDI or DVD	Physical		link format demodulated/retrieved from transmission/source

== Extended Data Service (XDS) ==
The EIA-608 data stream format includes Extended Data Service (XDS), which is a variety of information about the transmission. All XDS fields are technically optional per the specification, but various elements, such as those associated with the V-chip, may be semi-legally enforced by the FCC or other communications and accessibility bodies dependent on the jurisdiction.

- Program name
- Content guidelines (e.g. the American DLSV system etc.)
- Program category (drama, game show, etc.)

== Characters ==
The standard defines three character types, basic (two per command), along with special and extended (both one per command). Extended characters were added later and are optional for decoders. They're transmitted using two-byte commands in the Vertical Blanking Interval.

It also includes formatting options for foreground and background color, underlining, italics, and blinking. By default, captions appear as white text on a black opaque background.

The Transparent Space character creates a blank area with a transparent background, allowing gaps in caption text even without background commands.

== Manual decoding ==
Line 21 closed captions can be manually decoded from a raw VBI capture using video analysis or subtitle-editing software.

Each caption data transmission consists of two 7-bit characters sent per video field, embedded in a waveform that includes start and parity bits. To decode manually, the start and parity bits are removed, leaving the 7-bit values, which are then reversed to match the EIA-608 character encoding.

The first character may represent either a printable character or a control code. When a control code is encountered, it determines how the second character should be interpreted, such as selecting a character set, issuing formatting commands, or modifying the decoder state. These state changes persist until altered by later control codes. Most of the character values overlap with standard ASCII, with additional codes reserved for special characters and formatting.

In some older analog broadcasts, caption data was occasionally transmitted on line 22 as well as line 21, often for redundancy or experimental purposes. Standard decoders generally ignore line 22 data, but it may be visible when analyzing raw VBI captures.
