= CC4 =

CC4 may refer to:

- Cushioncraft CC4, the first car-sized hovercraft
- Juan Orlando Hernández, current Honduran President (named by drug traffickers in files in the Southern District of New York)
- the French armored combat commands CC4 in Colmar Pocket
- the version 4 of Calculus Calculator, a numerical-analysis software
- the closed captioning channel CC4 in the Extended Data Services
- version 4 of the Creative Commons licenses
- Promenade MRT station, Singapore

CC-4 may refer to:

- USS Ranger (CC-4) would have been a Lexington-class battlecruiser, but was cancelled before completion
