= Gregory T. Frazier =

American professor, author and Emmy award winner

Gregory Thomas Frazier (1938–1996) was an American author, professor and Emmy award winner who pioneered the use of audio description in film and TV. He died at age 58 due to cancer. He was the president of the not-for-profit company Audiovision.
