= Media Access Australia =

Australian accessibility organisation

Media Access Australia (M.A.A.) is an Australian organisation that works to improve digital accessibility for people with disabilities. The organisation also offers a university-accredited online degree called the Professional Certificate in Web Accessibility (P.C.W.A.), which is taught in six-week modules.

M.A.A. provides information about technological solutions, such as audio description and captioning, to make audio-visual media, including streaming services, TV, cinema, DVDs and new media, accessible to people with disabilities. M.A.A supports improvements in media access in Australia towards best practice by identifying technological solutions and ways to implement them.

M.A.A. works with consumer organisations; Government and industry in Australia and internationally.

== Background ==
Media Access Australia, originally known as the Australian Caption Center (A.C.C.), was co-founded by Adam Salzer and Alexandra Hynes in 1982. In 2005, A.C.C. sold its commercial operations, including captioning services, to Red Bee Media.
