= Red Bee Media =

International media services company

Red Bee Media Ltd.
- Type: Subsidiary
- Industry: Media
- Founded: November 3, 2005; 20 years ago (as Red Bee Media)
- Headquarters: London, England, UK
- Key people: James Arnold (CEO)
- Number of employees: Approximately 2,100 (Q4 2022)
- Parent: Ericsson
- Website: www.redbeemedia.com

Red Bee Media Ltd., formerly Ericsson Broadcast and Media Services (EBMS), is an international broadcasting and media services company and the largest access provider in Europe. Red Bee has its headquarters in London, England, with branch offices in Glasgow, Cardiff, MediaCityUK in Salford and Newcastle upon Tyne, and international offices in Australia, France, Spain, Germany, Finland, the Netherlands, Sweden, Canada, United States and Abu Dhabi. It has 2,500 employees worldwide across eight media hubs and distributes over 2.7 million hours of programming each year worldwide. It is a wholly owned subsidiary of Ericsson.

Clients include television broadcasters such as the BBC, Canal+, Channel 4, ITV, Sky, TV4, TV5Monde, and UKTV, as well as brands such as Barclays, Bacardi and Hyundai. Red Bee Media transmits over 500 television streams on analogue, digital terrestrial, digital satellite, cable, web and mobile, among them all the domestic BBC channels (except for BBC Parliament, the production and playout of which is handled by Millbank Studios), along with international channels including BBC World News, BBC Worldwide and BBC Lifestyle and have a presence in over 180 countries and territories. It handles the majority of video on demand (VOD) services in the UK, including Channel 4 (All 4), Channel 5 (My5) and UKTV (UKTV Play).

== History and locations ==
While Red Bee Media originates from BBC Broadcast in the United Kingdom, the company stems from Creative Broadcast Services, which was jointly owned by Australia-based Macquarie Capital Alliance Group and Macquarie Bank, and was set up specifically for the purchase of the former BBC operation.

In August 2011 Red Bee Media purchased TV Genius, a software company that specialises in content discovery across the internet, TV and connected devices.

On 1 July 2013, Ericsson announced it would acquire Red Bee Media to complement the company's previous acquisitions in the broadcast and media industry: the broadcast services division of Technicolor, Tandberg Television, HyC Group, Fabrix Systems and Microsoft Mediaroom. On 30 September, the transaction was referred to the Competition Commission, amid fears the deal would reduce competition in the television channel playout sector. The deal was cleared by the commission on 27 February 2014, and Ericsson completed its acquisition of Red Bee Media on 12 May. The company rebranded under its parent's brand on 1 June 2015.

On 9 November 2017, it was announced that Ericsson Broadcast and Media Services would be renamed as Red Bee Media and become an independent business fully owned by Ericsson. The move was reported to be to clear the way for a sale of the division which has been retained by Ericsson.

=== United Kingdom ===
Red Bee's predecessor BBC Broadcast Limited was created by the BBC in 2002, by placing a range of BBC channel creation and channel management services under one roof. It was part of an agreement with the British government to create a commercial division that could supplement the BBC's income from the television licence, thus keeping the licence fee increases down in the future. The other entities within the commercial division were BBC Worldwide, BBC Resources, BBC Ventures and BBC Technology.

On 1 August 2005, BBC Broadcast, together with its subsidiaries, was sold for £166 million to Creative Broadcast Services Limited, a company set up specifically for the purchase and jointly owned by Australia-based Macquarie Capital Alliance Group and Macquarie Bank Limited. The company was renamed Red Bee Media on 27 October 2005. Shortly before the sale, BBC Broadcast bought Broadcasting Dataservices ("BDS") from BBC Worldwide thus strengthening the EPG and programme metadata offering. Red Bee Creative is the creative agency that operates within Red Bee Media. Based in White City, Red Bee Creative was responsible for the creation of various entertainment brands including BBC Sport, UKTV's Dave and BT Sport. They have also produced creative campaigns for Nissan, Oasis, Netflix and Weston's Cider.

=== Australia ===
In 2006 the company purchased the commercial operations of the Australian Caption Centre (ACC) in 2006 for A$7.5 million (GBP3.2 million), rebranding them as Red Bee Media Australia in March 2007. The remaining part of the ACC became the not-for-profit Media Access Australia.

=== Germany ===
In March 2008, Red Bee Media acquired Titelbild Subtitling and Translation GmbH, a multilingual subtitling and translation service providers, enabling Red Bee Media to offer translation services into many languages as well as expanding Red Bee Media into the German market.

=== Spain ===
In October 2008, Red Bee Media acquired Mundovisión, the largest independent subtitling and audio description company in Spain. Alongside the recent acquisition of Titelbild in Germany, the addition of Mundovisión consolidated Red Bee Media's position as Europe's largest supplier of subtitling, signing and audio description services to the media industry.

=== The Netherlands ===
The Netherlands department of Red Bee is a in-1988-privitised division of the public broadcaster NOS. This division has had several name changes and has been acquired multiple times over the years. Nederlands Omroepproduktie Bedrĳf (Netherlands Broadcast Production Company) was created in 1988 by law to create more competition in the audiovisual market, until the company was divided in multiple standalone companies in 2002 due to persistenly financial struggles. NOB Cross Media Facilities from 2002 until Thomson acquired the company in 2006, therefore renamed to Technicolor Nederland from 2008 to 2012. In July 2012 Ericsson purchased Technicolor and merged them into Ericsson Broadcast and Media Services. In 2017 was the latest name change to Red Bee Media B.V.

Red Bee is responsible for the network control of the Dutch public broadcasting system as well as delivering recordings and transcoding for archiving and video on demand platforms such as NPO Start and Videoland. The Dutch subsidiary provides MCR services to the NOS, RTL and the Dutch regional broadcasters. ESPN is also a client of the Dutch division until the summer of 2025. Other services are (real-time) subtitling and translation.

Until 2017 the company provided the technical crew and support for the news broadcasts and studios of the NOS. From 1 January 2017 EMG the Netherlands took over these tasks for ten years.

=== United States ===
Red Bee Media acquired Technicolor’s broadcast services division in July 2012 and FYI Television in January 2016.

== Operations and services ==
In addition to channel playout, media management, content discovery platform and electronic program guide services, Red Bee Media provides "creative services" such as creation of advertisements, promotions and trailers for radio, television and interactive television and "access services" such as subtitling, signing and audio description for the BBC, Channel 4 and Channel 5 programming. The company also provides compliance, media management, design and support services, like encoding and editing video for mobile phone operators and VOD and IPTV operators such as the BBC iPlayer, Orange and UK cable company Virgin Media.

Red Bee Media operates interactive television for the BBC, UKTV and others and provides webmaster services for BBC Online and other websites. It markets complex design systems for television such as its sports analysis tool called Piero, which is a 3D sport graphic system designed to analyse sports on TV.

Red Bee Media also opened a subtitling division in Paris, France in January 2007, which subtitles for the French TV channel M6.

=== 2021 London Broadcast Centre incident ===
Red Bee Media's broadcast centre in London was evacuated on 25 September 2021 following a fire alarm. The fire extinguisher system caused damage to servers and storage devices that resulted in national television channels going off air during primetime. Channel 4, Channel 5, BT Sport, JSTV, More4, Film4, E4, 4Music, The Box, Box Hits, Kiss, Magic and Kerrang! were impacted. Channel 4 with their brands were badly affected. Live continuity announcements for BBC channels were also taken off air. Accessibility services such as subtitles and audio description tracks were also severely disrupted, with some features not becoming available again until mid-November. This caused several people depending on these services to complain to the UK broadcasting industry regulator Ofcom.
