= Alan Newell =

Alan Newell may refer to:

- Alan C. Newell (born 1941), Irish/American mathematician
- Alan Newell (English computer scientist), professor emeritus of computer science and human-computer interaction at the University of Dundee

== See also ==
- Allen Newell (1927–1992), researcher in computer science and cognitive psychology
