= Extended Data Services =

Extended Data Services (now XDS, previously EDS), is an American standard classified under Electronic Industries Alliance standard EIA-608 for the delivery of any ancillary data (metadata) to be sent with an analog television program, or any other NTSC video signal.

XDS is used by TV stations, TV networks, and TV program syndication distributors in the US for several purposes.

Here are some of the most common uses of XDS:

- The "autoclock" system delivers time data via an XDS "Time-of-Day Packet" for automatically setting the clock of newer TVs & VCRs sold in the US. Most PBS stations provide this service.
- Rudimentary program information which can be displayed on-screen, such as the name and remaining time of the program,
- Station identification,
- V-chip content ratings data.

XDS is also used by the American TV network ABC for their Network Alert System (NAS). NAS is a one-way communication system used by ABC to inform and alert their local affiliate stations across the US of information regarding ABC's network programming (such as program timings & changes, news special report information, etc.), using a special decoder manufactured for ABC by EEG Enterprises , a manufacturer of related equipment for the TV broadcast industry such as closed captioning and general-purpose XDS encoders. The CBS Television Network uses a similar method to transmit three separate internal messaging services to stations: one for programming departments, one for master control operations, and one for newsrooms.

Many standard definition receivers produced by Dish Network encode XDS data into their output signal. Data encoded includes time of day, program name, program description, program time remaining, channel identification, and content rating. This data is obtained from the satellite service's EPG and replaces any data which may have been present when the signal was uplinked.

XDS uses the same line in the vertical blanking interval as closed captioning (NTSC line 21), and shares the available second video field bandwidth with the closed captioning channels CC3 and CC4, and with the text channels TXT3 and TXT4.

XDS information is used by TV commercial detection software to skip advertisements.
