= E-captioning =

e-Captioning is a workflow for adding closed captioning data to video tapes and files. This process uses software to encode the closed captioning data into a video, instead of the dedicated closed caption hardware encoders that were previously required. Originally, e-Captioning could be done only for web based new media formats such as Windows Media, Real Video, QuickTime, and Flash. However, e-Captioning is now available to TV Broadcast facilities for tapeless workflows.

Prior to the advent of e-Captioning, closed captioning was added to a video using a linear deck-to-deck process, which required the use of a physical master video tape, two tape decks (play and record), and a hardware closed captioning encoder. Since this equipment is very expensive, it was not practical for most video production facilities to own it on site. Instead, video editors had to first output a video to tape, then mail the tape to a special closed captioning facility. In the process, a second video tape with closed captions would be created, incurring generation loss. Finally, the tape would need to be mailed to its final destination. If the video later required edits or changes, then the producer would have to ship another master tape to the closed captioning facility, repeating the process and possibly incurring additional fees.

e-Captioning replaces the hardware encoding step with a non-linear file based workflow. Since it can be accomplished via e-mail, FTP, or other file transfer methods, there are no costs for physically shipping a video tape, and less impact on the environment. This also means that e-Captioning can be performed faster, and the resulting video can be of higher quality due to the lack of generation loss. Finally, e-Captioning opens up new options for delivering captioned video with tapeless video workflows, further editing of the video in a non-linear editing system, or converting videos from one format to another (for example, from tape to web video) while preserving the closed captions.
