= Speech-to-text reporter =

Human occupation

A speech-to-text reporter (STTR), also known as a captioner, is a person who listens to what is being said and inputs it, word for word (verbatim), as properly written texts. Many captioners use tools (such as a shorthand keyboard, speech recognition software, or a computer-aided transcription software system), which commonly convert verbally communicated information into written words to be composed as a text. The reproduced text can then be read by deaf or hard-of-hearing people, language learners, or people with auditory processing disabilities.

== Methods ==
Real-time captioning includes stenographic, voice writing, and automatic speech recognition methods. Occasional mondegreen errors may be seen in closed-captions when the computer software fails to distinguish where a word break occurs in the syllable stream. Information such as laughter or applause is shared inside a bracket.

=== Voice writing ===
Voice writers echo spoken language into a stenomask or voice silencer, which consists of a hand-held mask equipped with microphones and voice-dampening materials. This setup connects to an external sound digitizer. The words spoken by a voice writer are converted by the computer's speech recognition engine into streaming text and can be disseminated in various formats, including internet streaming, subtitling, or direct displays for end-users.

=== Stenography ===
==== Palantype and stenotype ====
Two major chorded keyboards used in speech-to-text reporting are the palantype and stenotype systems. Both systems are used in the UK. STTRs might also be termed palantypists or stenographers. Instead of pressing each letter individually, like on a QWERTY keyboard, these systems use chords, where multiple keys are pressed simultaneously in a "stroke" to represent syllables, words, or phrases.

==== Software ====
Stenographers use specialized software to convert phonetic strokes from their keyboards into English text. Errors may arise from STTRs mishearing words or from ambiguities in the statement that are only clarified by subsequent context.

== See also ==
- Closed captioning
- Same language subtitling
- Sign language
- Surtitles
- Transcription (linguistics)
