= MPEG user data =

The MPEG user data feature provides a means to inject application-specific data into an MPEG elementary stream. User data can be inserted on three different levels:

- The sequence level
- The group of pictures (GOP) level
- The picture data level

Applications that process MPEG data do not need to be able to understand data encapsulated in this way, but should be able to preserve it.

Examples of information embedded in MPEG streams as user data are:

- Aspect ratio information
- "Hidden" information per the Active Format Description specification
- Closed captioning per the EIA-708 standard
