= CTA-708 =

Standard for closed captioning for ATSC digital television

CTA-708 (formerly EIA-708 and CEA-708) is the standard for closed captioning for ATSC digital television (DTV) broadcasts in the United States and Canada. It was developed by the Consumer Electronics sector of the Electronic Industries Alliance, which later became the standalone organization Consumer Technology Association. It replaced the previous EIA-608 standard for captioning, which was designed for analog NTSC broadcasts.

Unlike RLE DVB and DVD subtitles, CTA-708 captions are low bandwidth and textual like traditional EIA-608 captions and EBU Teletext subtitles. However, unlike EIA-608, CTA-708 captions must be pre-rendered by the receiver with the digital video frames. The prior 608 standard transmitted subtitles on an invisible line (line 21) of NTSC's vertical blanking interval (VBI). This is no longer possible on digital receivers using ATSC.

The CTA-708 standard also includes more of the Latin-1 character set, and includes stubs to support full UTF-32 captions as well as downloadable fonts. CTA-708 caption streams can also optionally encapsulate EIA-608 byte pairs internally, which was still more common than native CTA-708 in 2015.

CTA-708 captions are injected into MPEG-2 video streams in the picture user data. The packets are in picture order, and must be rearranged just like picture frames are. This is known as the DTVCC Transport Stream. It is a fixed-bandwidth channel that has 960 bit/s typically allocated for backward compatible "encapsulated" Line 21 captions, and 8640 bit/s allocated for CTA-708 captions, for a total of 9600 bit/s. The ATSC A/53 Standard contains the encoding specifics. The main form of signalling is via a PSIP caption descriptor which indicates the language of each caption and if formatted for "easy reader" (3rd grade level for language learners) in the PSIP EIT on a per event basis and optionally in the H.222 PMT only if the video always sends caption data.

CTA-708 caption decoders are required in the U.S. by FCC regulation in all 13-inch (33 cm) diagonal or larger digital televisions. Further, some broadcasters are required by FCC regulations to caption a percentage of their broadcasts.
