= Alex Jones (actor) =

American actor

Alex Jones is an Australian actor and advocate for people who are deaf or have a hearing impairment. He was a co-founder and brand ambassador of Access Innovation Media (Ai-Media).

== Early life ==
Jones was born to a deaf family in Michigan, U.S.A. A graduate of NYU's Tisch School of the Arts, he was recruited to Australia in 1997 by the Australian Theatre of the Deaf.

== Career ==
Alex Jones started his career as an actor for TV and other productions. In 2001-2002, he portrayed the role of Lyle Slater on All Saints. He also worked on a show The Wild Boys from the Australian Theatre of the Deaf.

Jones co-founded the Access Innovation Media (Ai-Media) in 2003. The company has developed Ai-Live, a realtime, word accurate speech-to-text captioning program using broadband technology which featured and won on ABC1’s The New Inventors.

Jones was the Director of the 2005 Deaflympic Games Cultural Festival in Melbourne and toured Australia with Heads Up! – a theatre-in-education production. He appeared on Australian drama All Saints from 2001 to 2002, playing Lyle Slater.

Jones served as an ambassador for Don't DIS my ABILITY from 2004; he was the Chairperson of the Deafness Forum of Australia, a body representing the interests of people with hearing impairments, or chronic disorders of the ear. On 9 May 2014, Jones stepped down from Ai-Media but remained a shareholder of the company.

== See also ==
- National Captioning Institute (NCI)
