= IFanzy =

iFanzy
- Industry: technology
- Founded: 2009
- Services: EPG
- Parent: Stoneroos

iFanzy was a personalized electronic television program guide (EPG) developed by Stoneroos, a Dutch interactive television developer, in cooperation with the Eindhoven University of Technology. The iFanzy TV Guide was introduced in 2009, and available from the Google Play Store and Apple App Store.

The personalized EPG provided the viewer with an offer of programs selected especially for them, based on their personal interests and the mood they are in. iFanzy could be used next to a regular EPG. It was developed by a government subsidized project led by Philips.

iFanzy ceased operations by April 2018 due to changes in public demand.
