= TV Genius =

Software company

- Type: Ltd
- Founded: London, United Kingdom
- Founder: Bob Eggington; Tom Weiss
- Headquarters: London, United Kingdom
- Area served: Worldwide
- Parent: Red Bee Media

TV Genius was a United Kingdom-based software company that specialize in TV search engines, TV recommendation engines, and EPG development. It was acquired by Red Bee Media in August 2011, and by Ericsson in July 2013. TV Genius became an integral part of the RedDiscovery portfolio with its core work related to TV solutions provided across TV, mobile, web, set top boxes, and devices like PlayStation and Nintendo Wii. The company worked with television operators in pay TV, IPTV, TV listings publishers, and mobile TV providers. It was known for its 3-screen TV search and for developing the Facebook-integrated EPG.

The company was founded in 2005 by the former project director of BBC News Online, Bob Eggington, and by Tom Weiss.

== Products ==
- Content Discovery Platform: delivers a content personalized TV search that provides relevant recommendations for viewers. The TV Genius Content Discovery Platform has been deployed in 8 different languages.
- TV and VOD Search: Searches television listings and Video on Demand content, enabling search by keyword, actor, genre and time.
- TV Content Recommendations: promotes targeted TV recommendations based on Bayes' theorem that are contextual and relevant to the viewer.
- Remote Record: allows multiple users to remotely record TV shows or TV series on a set top box using SMS or a smartphone application.
- Online TV Guides: includes recommendation, remote record, push-reminders and personalisation features.
- Connected EPG: includes personalisation features can be deployed on Wii, PlayStation and other connected devices.
- Mobile app development: includes interactive elements, personalisation, and remote record features for TV-based mobile apps.
- Social Content Discovery: uses social media platforms like Twitter and Facebook to offer real-time recommendations and personalisation.

== Timeline ==
- Founded in 2005
- On 10 February 2010, TV Genius joined the NDS Group Recommendations Engine Partner Programme.
- On 17 February 2010, Freeview used TV Genius listings software in its iPhone app. On 15 March IP Vision announced their use of TV Genius' Content Discovery Platform in their FetchTV service.
- On 29 April 2010, GeniZenterio, the Swedish IPTV specialists, integrated the TV Genius Content Discovery platform into their own platform
- In October 2010, SES incorporated TV Genius' Content Discovery Platform into its new website.
- In January 2011, Amino Communications and Intel partnered to launch a "companion" set-top box at CES. The device (called the Freedom Jump) was designed to complement existing cable and satellite set-top boxes with OTT content. TV Genius developed the EPG for the Freedom Jump.
- On 29 March 2011, TV Genius added a backwards scrolling feature to their EPG solutions, allowing catch up content to be mapped into the TV guide
- In April 2011, TV Genius deployed an online TV guide for Scottish Television
- On 6 June 2011, TV Genius released a new social TV statistics service, allowing Twitter to be integrated into content discovery solutions.
- On 11 July 2011, TV Genius added a Facebook-integrated TV Guide to the Content Discovery Platform software.
- On 3 August 2011, it was announced that TV Genius was being acquired by Red Bee Media.

== Awards ==
- On 4 June 2010 TV Genius was selected for a Top 100 Red Herring Europe Tech Start-Up Award
- On 13 September 2010 TV Genius was amongst The Guardian's Tech Media Invest 100 companies in the 'Advertising and Search' category
- On 26 October 2010 TV Genius won the Content, Entertainment, Applications and Services section of the Broadband InfoVision Awards
- On 28 February 2011 the TV app "Astra Recommends" won first prize in the Samsung Smart TV Challenge. The recommendations component of the app was powered by TV Genius.
- On 4 August 2011 TV Genius' social content discovery feature was shortlisted for the "Search and Content Discovery" prize at the Connected World Awards

== See also ==
- Smart TV
- Hybrid digital TV
- Enhanced TV
- Interactive television
