= 3Play Media =

American audio transcription company

- Company type: Private
- Industry: Accessibility
- Founded: 2007; 1993 (CaptionMax)
- Founders: Josh Miller and Chris Antunes
- Headquarters: Boston, Massachusetts, United States
- Products: Closed captioning, Audio description, Subtitling
- Parent: 3Play Media
- Website: www.3playmedia.com

3Play Media is a media accessibility platform based in Boston, Massachusetts, providing closed captioning, audio description, and subtitling services for television, video content, and podcasts. The company was founded by Josh Miller and Chris Antunes in 2007.

== History ==
Founded in 2007, 3Play Media developed a range of accessibility solutions for sectors including media and entertainment, education, corporate, government, and e-learning. The company's acquisition of Captionmax, a media accessibility provider, in February 2022 expanded 3Play Media's offerings in live captioning and media accessibility services. The acquisition led to Captionmax's rebranding as 3Play Media on September 21, 2022.

Captionmax, established in 1993, offered closed captioning, translation, video description, and as-broadcast scripts to over 450 customers, including major broadcast and cable TV networks, studios, educational institutions, and corporations. Captionmax's acquisition of National Captioning Canada in March 2021 further expanded its media accessibility services.

3Play Media's cloud-based platform combines machine learning, proprietary data sets, and automatic speech recognition with human review for accurate accessibility solutions.

== See also ==
- Closed captioning
- Audio description
- Subtitles
