= Joseph N. Jackson =

African American inventor (1937–2025)

- Born: 1937; Harvey, Louisiana
- Died: August 19, 2025 (aged 87–88)
- Occupation: Inventor

Joseph N. Jackson (1937-August 19, 2025) is an African-American innovator and inventor. As the inventor of the programmable controller for the VCR, DVR, TIVO, TV systems and holder of six patents relating to telecommunications his contributions to digital entertainment can be seen everywhere. In today's economy the achievements into digital entertainment has become a priority to most. However, Jackson's contributions to the digital entertainment are under represented. He died August 19, 2025, of natural causes.

== Biography ==
Born in 1937, Jackson was raised in a household of eight in Harvey, Louisiana. As a child he had a profound fascination with electronics, often being found disassembling various appliances in his home. His fascination with all things mechanical was noticed and encouraged by his mother. By the time Jackson was 12, he became a pseudo-maintenance man for his local community, often working to fix broken or damaged appliances.

== Education ==
Some time later, Jackson decided to enlist in the U.S. Army at 17, just before finishing high school, and was accepted at age 18. During his service he spent his time servicing ships and acting as a Military Policeman. However, due to his service in the army he was unable to complete his high school education and worked on receiving a GED. During his service he was once stationed in Korea, where he spent his nights enrolled in television and radio repair school before opening a repair shop of his very own in Fayetteville, North Carolina. Following in the interests he had as a child Jackson continued to serve while working in the shop part-time for 7 years.

Eventually Jackson was honorably discharged in 1968 after serving for close to 13 years. Two years later he decided to re-enlist, this time serving as an equipment technician in Korea. In 1971, Jackson graduated from the United States Army Recruiting and Retention College as a recruiter. After achieving so much during his time in the army Jackson decided to pursue further achievements with his educational career. During his time as a recruiter he obtained an associates degree in Business Administration from Columbia College in 1975. Years later, in 2008 Jackson earned a doctorate in Applied Science and Technology from Glendale University.

== Achievements ==
Despite dropping out of high school to serve in the U.S. Army, Dr. Jackson has earned several notable achievements over his military career. Aside from earning several degrees, including a doctorate in Applied Science and Technology, Dr. Jackson became an official inventor in 1978.

- It was around 1976 that Dr. Jackson came up with the idea to produce a programmable receiver for the VCR, DVR, TIVO, and TV systems. In 1978, he successfully received a patent for his invention which became the precursor to the development of the V-chip and equipment still implemented in modern technology.
- In 1994, Dr. Jackson, alongside Joe Edmonds and Veronica L. Shealy, founded the Black Inventions Museum.
