= Retinitis Pigmentosa International =

US-based non-profit organization

RPI's official logo

Retinitis Pigmentosa International (RPI or RP International) is an international, 501(c)(3) non-profit organization that is committed to focusing world attention on eye problems. RP International promotes research, public awareness, education, and human services for victims of degenerative eye diseases.

== Vision Awards and Eyes of Christmas ==
RPI presents and organizes the Vision Awards annually from Hollywood, which raises funds for RP International, and is dedicated to honoring individuals and companies who have illustrated exceptional "vision, foresight, and insight" in the creative arts, related technologies and medical research. The event also highlights scientific landmarks in adult stem cell transplants, microchip implants, and pharmaceuticals. In 2006, the Vision Awards took special note of adult stem cell research by honoring a patient who was able to regain sight thanks to the LSU technique after more than 20 years of blindness.

The "Eyes of Christmas" is a television program in which the blind and visually impaired people can "watch" holiday shows by hearing descriptive narrations of the shows. The program is aired on a variety of cable networks and independent television stations, and features celebrities presenting holiday music, memories, and films, over the 12 days leading up to Christmas.

== TheatreVision ==
TheatreVision is an RPI program that makes films accessible to the visually impaired. It incorporates a special soundtrack in films that runs concurrently with the dialogue of the picture. The track provides a "descriptive narration" of what is being shown on the screen. Forrest Gump was the first film to be completed in this format, making its TheatreVision debut before a visually challenged audience. These formatted films are made available to the visually impaired through theatres, libraries, charitable organizations, special screenings, and schools for the blind.

Many TheatreVision presentations are audio described by celebrities, often who have a connection to the film. The 1999 Disney film Tarzan was described by actor Tony Goldwyn, who also performed the voice of the lead character in the film, and Samuel L. Jackson performed the description for Star Wars: Episode I – The Phantom Menace. TheatreVision has also prepared special presentations for television, often providing live descriptions of the annual Academy Awards, and notably describing the classic film It's a Wonderful Life for NBC's traditional annual broadcast of the film (with the descriptive audio carried on the SAP (Second Audio Program) channel), with the narrative description performed by former president George H. W. Bush.

== Founder ==
Helen Harris is the founder of RPI and a longtime activist for the blind and vision impaired. As a housewife, painter, and young mother, Harris learned that she was slowly going blind from retinitis pigmentosa. She then learned that two of her three sons had inherited her disease. In 1973, she began RPI to provide support and counsel to those who suffer from retinitis pigmentosa and other degenerative eye diseases, and to find a cure for those diseases.

== See also ==
- Retinitis pigmentosa
- Macular degeneration
- Stem cells
- Eye disease
