= Weemote =

Television remote control made by Fobis Technologies

The Weemote

The Weemote is a television remote control made by Fobis Technologies that was designed for young children.

== Design ==
The Weemote was designed for younger children to limit their ability to surf television channels, and also to partially serve as a learning tool. The remote looks like a toy with buttons that are different colors and specific shapes. Each button can be programmed to a specific television channel. There are several variants of the product, Weemote 2, an updated version, and Weemote Sr., intended for the elderly.

== Trademark violation claims against Nintendo ==
The term "Weemote" was originally trademarked in 2000 by Fobis Technologies. While spelled differently, the term "Weemote" is phonetically identical to "Wiimote", the unofficial term for the Wii Remote, Nintendo's controller for the Wii which debuted six years later in 2006. Fobis Technologies claims this to be trademark infringement, however Nintendo does not actually use the term "Wiimote" in official promotional materials; many retailers that sell the Wii Remote do use the term. Fobis sent out up to 100 cease and desist letters to retailers and have made offers to Nintendo for them to purchase the trademark. Nintendo declined the offer, stating that it "does not use and does not plan to use the Weemote trademark".
