= National Captioning Institute =

American nonprofit organization

National Captioning Institute, Inc.
- Abbreviation: NCI
- Founded: January 30, 1979; 47 years ago
- Tax ID no.: 52-1144663
- Legal status: 501(c)(3) nonprofit organization
- Purpose: To provide access to public media for those who, for whatever reason, are restricted from that access.
- Headquarters: Chantilly, Virginia
- Coordinates: 38.908850°N 77.447857°W
- Chairman, President, Chief Executive Officer: Gene Chao
- Revenue: $17,845,288 (2016)
- Expenses: $17,288,663 (2016)
- Endowment: $24,947 _{(2016)}
- Employees: 229 (2016)
- Website: ncicap.org

The National Captioning Institute, Inc. (NCI) is an American 501(c)(3) nonprofit organization that provides real-time and off-line closed captioning, subtitling and translation, described video, web captioning, and Spanish captioning for television and films. Created in 1979 and headquartered in Chantilly, Virginia, the organization was the first to caption live TV and home video, and holds the trademark on the display icon featuring a simple geometric rendering of a cathode ray tube television set merged with a speech balloon to indicate that a program is captioned by National Captioning Institute. National Captioning Institute also has an office in Santa Clarita, California.

== History ==
The National Association of Broadcasters formed a task force in 1972 to create the technology to provide captions of television broadcasts without an unreasonably large financial burden on television networks or local television stations. Federal funding paid for the technology. Viewers would buy an adapter for their televisions that would decode and display the text while watching closed-captioned television programs. Up to that point, captioning of television shows was rare, with Boston television station WGBH being one of the few with open captioning of news and public affairs shows since the early 1970s.

The National Captioning Institute was incorporated on January 30, 1979, with millions of dollars of start-up funding from the federal government. On March 23, 1979, the United States Department of Health, Education, and Welfare announced plans for closed-captioning of twenty hours per week of television shows. The National Captioning Institute established its original headquarters in Bailey's Crossroads, Virginia, and later that year it established a second office in Los Angeles.

The National Captioning Institute's work first became publicly well known on March 16, 1980, when ABC, NBC, and PBS collectively introduced closed-captioning of their television shows. At the time, CBS decided not the join the group at first because CBS preferred a different captioning system that was being used in Europe. John E.D. Ball was the founding president of the National Captioning Institute. Marc Okrand was the National Captioning Institute's first supervisor of captioning, overseeing the transcription of audio. At the time, employees of the National Captioning Institute used court-reporter steno machines to caption shows.

Rosalynn Carter hosted a reception at the White House honoring the work of the National Captioning Institute on March 19, 1980. In 1981, Hollywood Radio and Television Society gave an award to the National Captioning Institute for developing the closed captioning system for television shows.

In 1981, RCA/Columbia Pictures Home Video became the first video company to release movies on videotape that had closed captions.

In 1982, the NCI developed real-time captioning, a process for captioning newscasts, sports events, and other live broadcasts as the events are being televised, thereby bringing thousands of households into national conversations in a way that had previously been impossible.

Also in 1982, the NCI provided the first real-time captioning for a live event, the Academy Awards. A court reporter trained as a captioner provided the captions using a Stenotype machine, which uses phonetic codes and allows the captioner to take down the spoken word at speeds of up to 250 words per minute. The ad-libs and the awarding of the Oscars were live captioned by the steno captioner, while a production coordinator displays the prepared captions of the scripted portions of the broadcast. Later that year, ABC's "World News Tonight" was the first regularly scheduled program to be real-time captioned.

In 1989, the NCI partnered with ITT to develop the first caption-decoding microchip to be built directly into new television sets in the factory. It led to the passage of the Television Decoder Circuitry Act in 1990, mandating that all new television sets 13 inches or larger manufactured for sale in the U.S. contain caption-decoding technology.

In 1993, a federal law went into effect that required built-in capacity to display captions on all televisions 13 inches or larger, which would make purchasing separate decoders no longer necessary. Virtually all television shows were being broadcast with closed-captions at that point.

In 2006, the National Captioning Institute terminated the employment of 14 employees who had joined the National Association of Employees and Transmission Technicians in an effort to have reasonable workloads, receive annual cost-of-living raises, and prevent cuts in employee benefit plans.

In 2015–2016, National Captioning Institute employees attempted to organize with the Communication Workers of America (CWA), again in an effort to have reasonable workloads, receive annual cost-of-living raises, and prevent cuts in employee benefit plans." [T]he National Association of Broadcast Employees & Technicians–Communication Workers of America, AFL–CIO (the Union) attempted to unionize NCI's TX and CA offices. [...] On June 26, [COO] Toschi sent this email to NCI management about the Union:"

[E]mployees have been attempting to [unionize] …. There are a considerable number of employees … that have expressed interest …. [The] union … will be holding a meeting on June 29…. [T]he threat is serious. NCI's position… is solidly against unionization. I will be sending a company-wide communication to this effect ….

— President and COO Jill Toschi,

NCI responded with actions that according to the judge violated labor laws, "which included firing two workers, interrogating employees, searching employees' chat logs for union discussions, sending anti-union emails to employees, maintaining an unlawful social media policy, and maintaining an unacceptable behavior policy."

"An NLRB administrative law judge in Fort Worth, Tex., found that the National Captioning Institute violated federal law when it fired two workers for their union activity, and committed other labor law violations. [...] [Judge Robert Ringler] ordered NCI to cease and desist all unlawful practices, rescind illegal and overbroad policies, and offer the two fired workers reinstatement with full back pay, plus interest. NCI also was ordered to notify employees of the NLRB order by email and Intranet."

== See also ==
- Alex Jones – Actor and founder of a company offering real-time, word accurate speech-to-text captioning program using broadband technology
- Linda Bove – Deaf actress on Sesame Street who advocated for television sets to be required to display closed captions
- Julia Child – Her cooking show The French Chef became the first television program to be captioned for the deaf in 1972 (using the preliminary technology of open-captioning)
- Phyllis Frelich – Deaf actress who won a Tony Award for Children of a Lesser God
- Americans with Disabilities Act (ADA) (1990)
  - Auxiliary aid
- Telecommunications Act (1996)
