= Audio description =

Audio tracks for partially sighted viewers

Audio description (AD), also referred to as a video description, described video, or visual description, is a form of narration used to provide information surrounding key visual elements in a media work (such as a film or television program, or theatrical performance) for the benefit of blind and visually impaired consumers. These narrations are typically placed during natural pauses in the audio, and sometimes overlap dialogue if deemed necessary. Occasionally when a film briefly has subtitled dialogue in a different language, the narrator will read out the subtitles.

In museums or visual art exhibitions, audio described tours (or universally designed tours that include description or the augmentation of existing recorded programs on audio- or videotape), are used to provide access to visitors who are blind or have low vision. Docents or tour guides can be trained to employ audio description in their presentations.

In film and television, description is typically delivered via a secondary audio track. In the United States, Second audio program (SAP) is typically used to deliver audio description by television broadcasters. To promote accessibility, broadcast regulations in some countries have implemented requirements for broadcasters to air specific quotas of programming containing audio description.

== History ==
The transition to "talkies" in the late 1920s resulted in a push to make the cinema accessible to the visually impaired. The New York Times documented the "first talking picture ever shown especially for the blind"—a 1929 screening of Bulldog Drummond attended by members of the New York Association for the Blind and New York League for the Hard of Hearing, which offered a live description for the visually-impaired portion of the audience. In the 1940s and 1950s, Radio Nacional de España aired live audio simulcasts of films from cinemas with descriptions, framing these as a form of radio drama before television services launched in the country.

In the 1980s, the Media Access Group of U.S. public television station WGBH-TV (which had already gained notability for their involvement in developing closed captioning) developed an implementation of audio description for television programming via second audio program (SAP), which it branded as "Descriptive Video Service" (DVS). It was developed in consultation with Dr. Margaret Pfanstiehl of Washington, D.C., who had performed descriptions at theatrical performances and had run a radio reading service known as the Washington Ear. After four years of development and on-air trials (which included a proof of concept that aired the descriptions on a radio station in simulcast with the television airing), WGBH officially launched audio description via 32 participating PBS member stations, beginning with the new season of American Playhouse on January 24, 1990.

In the 1990s at cinemas in California, RP International began to offer audio descriptions for theatrical films under the brand TheatreVision, relayed via earpieces to those who request it. A clip from Schindler's List was used to pitch the concept to the film's producers Gerald Molen and Branko Lustig, and one of the first films to be presented in this format was Forrest Gump (1994). TheatreVision sought notable personalities and celebrities to volunteer in providing these narrations, such as sportscaster Vin Scully, William Shatner, Monty Hall, and former U.S. president George H. W. Bush (for It's a Wonderful Life). Sometimes the narrator had ties to the film or was part of its cast; Irene Bedard described Pocahontas—a film where she had voiced the title character. For the 1994 remake of Little Women, stars from previous versions of the film volunteered, including June Allyson, Margaret O'Brien, and Janet Leigh (whose grandmother was blind) from the 1949 version of the film, as well as Katharine Hepburn—star of the 1933 version. Other companies emerged in providing descriptions for programming in the U.S., including the National Captioning Institute, Narrative Television Network, and others.

In the UK Audio Description services were made available on the BBC and ITV after a collaborative project with industry partners. In 2000, the BBC launched its audio description service; it has voluntarily committed to providing descriptions for 20% of its programming. In practice, the BBC has exceeded this target. In 2009, the BBC added audio-described programmes to BBC iPlayer, describing itself as the first broadcaster in the world to do so; by 2018, every programme that was broadcast with AD also had AD on BBC iPlayer. On January 29, 2009, The Accessible Channel was launched in Canada, which broadcasts "open" audio descriptions on all programming via the primary audio track. Audio description has also been extended to live events, including sporting events, the ceremonies of the Olympic and Paralympic Games, and the The Wiz Live! television production, among others.

In April 2015, the subscription streaming service Netflix announced that it had added support for audio description, beginning with Daredevil—a series based on a comic book character who himself is blind, and would add descriptions to current and past original series on the platform over time. The following year, as part of a settlement with the American Council of the Blind, Netflix agreed to provide descriptions for its original series within 30 days of their premiere, and add screen reader support and the ability to browse content by availability of descriptions.

In June 2016, Pornhub announced that it would launch a collection of pornographic videos with audio descriptions. The initiative is sponsored by the website's philanthropic arm Pornhub Cares.

In the late-2010s, Procter & Gamble began to add descriptions to its television commercials, first in the United Kingdom, and later Spain and the United States.

== Legal mandates in television broadcasting ==
=== Canada ===
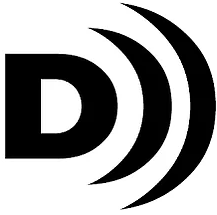
"D))" Described Video logo used for onscreen bugs

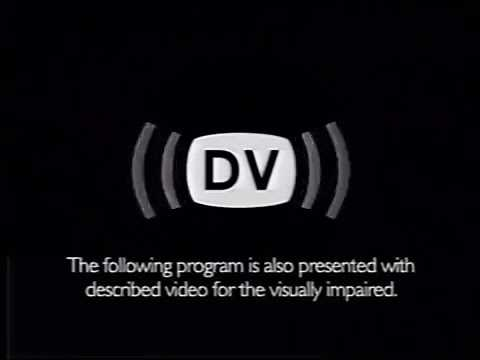
An example bumper used to denote a program with audio description, as required under Canadian broadcasting regulations

Under Canadian Radio-television and Telecommunications Commission (CRTC) rules, most television channels are required to carry quotas of programming with audio description. For regulatory purposes, audio description is referred to in Canada as described video (DV), as the CRTC uses "audio description" to refer to supplemental explanations of on-screen graphics and key visuals by presenters in news and information programs. Broadcasters must promote the availability of DV programming, including airing a standard audiovisual bumper and logo at the beginning of all programs offering description. All television providers are also required to carry AMI-tv (formerly The Accessible Channel), a specialty channel that broadcasts programming related to accessibility and disability; the channel carries DV on all programs in the primary audio track.

Initially, broadcast television stations and former Category A services that dedicated at least half of their programming to comedy, drama, or long-form documentary programs, were required to broadcast at least four hours of programming with described video, with two hours of this "original" to the channel per-week. These programs must have been drawn from children's, comedy, drama, long-form documentaries, general entertainment and human interest, reality, or variety genres.

On March 26, 2015, the CRTC announced that beginning September 1, 2019, broadcast and specialty networks owned by vertically integrated conglomerates, as well as any channel subject to existing license conditions specifying minimums for DV, would be required to supply described video for any prime-time programming (7:00 p.m. to 11:00 p.m.) that falls within the genres of children's, drama and comedy, long-form documentaries, general entertainment and human interest, reality, or variety. The requirement that a quota of DV programming be "original" to the network was also dropped. In addition, all other non-exempt broadcasters would be required to air at least four hours of DV programming per-week by the fourth year of their next license term.

Citing the possibility that imported U.S. programming may not necessarily be supplied with descriptions for their first airing (including in particular, programming with short turnaround times and live broadcasts such as reality competitions), the CRTC granted an exception to the prime time DV mandate to Bell Media, Corus Entertainment, and Rogers Media, for U.S. programming that is received without described video within 24 hours of its scheduled airing—provided that any repeat airings scheduled more than 24 hours after delivery contain descriptions.

In December 2025, per the modernization of the Broadcasting Act implemented by the Online Streaming Act, the CRTC ruled that DV requirements will be extended to online streaming services and video on-demand services within the next two years, applying to new pre-recorded scripted original programming, with services also expected to describe new third-party programming and "partially scripted live events of national interest" (with the CRTC citing that live descriptions during events such as the Academy Awards and ceremonies of the Olympic Games had demonstrated the feasibility of offering DV during similar events). Services will be required to provide an accessible search feature for programming that contains described video. The CRTC also renewed the exemption for DV on U.S. prime time programming received within 24 hours of airing, but will require broadcasters to submit an annual report on programming it was unable to air with described video.

=== United Kingdom ===
The Ofcom code on television access services requires broadcasters that have been on the air for at least five years to broadcast at least 10% of their programming with descriptions. Scrutiny has applied even to ESPN UK—a sports channel—which was fined £120,000 by Ofcom for not meeting an AD quota in 2012. The regulator rejected an argument by ESPN that AD was redundant to commentary, as it is "not provided with the needs of the visually impaired in mind".

=== United States ===
Onscreen bug used for televised Audio Description

Logo for Audio Description used in credits and covers

Initially, audio description was provided as a public service. However, in 2000, the Federal Communications Commission would enact a policy effective April 1, 2002, requiring the affiliates of the four major television networks in the top 25 markets, and television providers with more than 50,000 subscribers via the top 5 cable networks as determined by Nielsen ratings, to offer 50 hours of programming with descriptions during primetime or children's programming per-quarter. However, the order faced a court challenge led by the MPAA, who questioned the FCC's jurisdiction on the matter. In November 2002, the Court of Appeals for the District of Columbia Circuit ruled that the FCC had no statutory jurisdiction to enforce such a rule.

This was rectified in 2010 with the passing of the Twenty-First Century Communications and Video Accessibility Act, which gave the FCC jurisdiction to enforce video description requirements. The previously intended quotas were reinstated on July 1, 2012, and have been gradually increased to require more programming and wider participation since their implementation.

== Operation ==
Broadcast audio description is typically delivered via an alternate audio track, either as a separate language track containing the narration only (which, if the playback device is capable of doing so, is mixed with the primary audio track automatically, and can have separate volume settings), or on a secondary audio track pre-mixed with the primary track, such as a secondary audio program (SAP).

Many video on demand (VOD) and streaming platforms host separate assets for the audio-described media, with the soundtrack pre-mixed. Despite AD typically being presented as something that can be enabled (as with subtitles), users can encounter problems when trying to turn AD on or off because the underlying media version they require is unavailable.

In movie theaters, audio description can be heard using DVS Theatrical and similar systems (including DTS-CSS and Dolby Screentalk). Users listen to the description on a wireless headset. Audio description is stored in the Digital Cinema Package as "Visually Impaired-Narrative" (VI-N) audio on Sound Track channel 8.

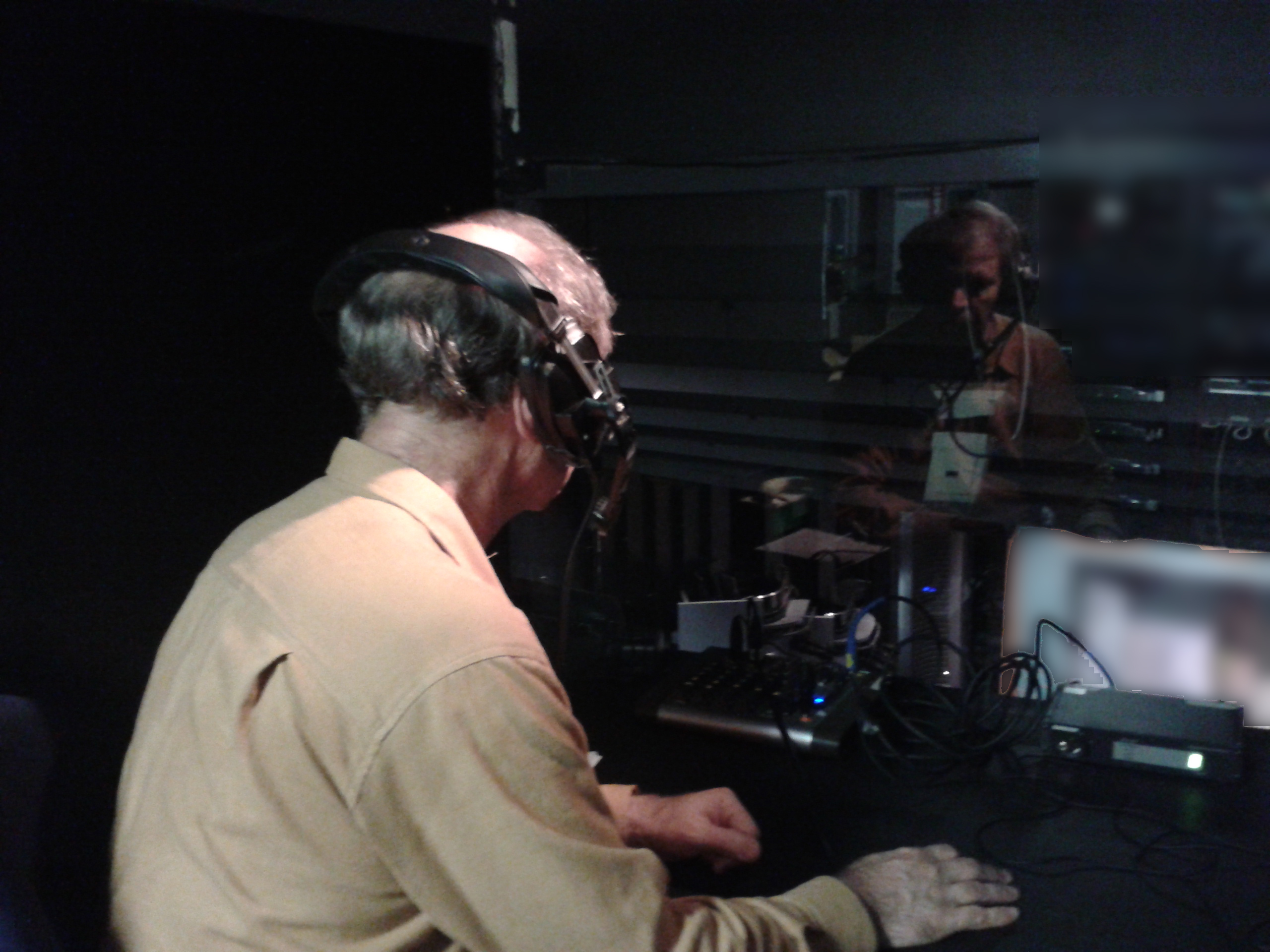
An audio describer working in a live theater. A small mixer and transmitter are visible, and the lit stage can be seen in the distance.

In live theaters, patrons also receive the description via a wireless device, a discreet monaural receiver. However, the description is provided live by describers located in a booth acoustically insulated from the audience, but from where they have a good view of the performance. They make their description which is fed to a small radio transmitter.

== Audio description in football stadiums ==
In Germany, live commentary for blind and visually impaired football fans in the stadium was first offered in 1999; the service became known nationwide and established at many venues with the 2006 FIFA World Cup. The project was very well-received and had great success. In 2008, audio description in football was also adopted in Switzerland. The radio of FC Basel 1893 was the first club in Switzerland to take up this topic. First, FC Basel installed an antenna in St. Jakob Park, which was used to broadcast the radio's live commentary. The visually impaired and blind fans could then listen to the commentary via a VHF frequency. More and more clubs in the Swiss Super League adopted this concept and today the matches can be heard via audio description in every stadium in Switzerland. At St. Jakob-Park in Basel, even without delay via the Internet. In the meantime, the outdated technology of FM transmission has been abolished. Today, the games are broadcast via cell phone apps. In Germany, almost every stadium is also equipped with this technology.

== Descriptive Video Service ==
The Descriptive Video Service (DVS) is a major United States producer of audio description. DVS often is used to describe the product itself.

In 1985, PBS member television station WGBH-TV in Boston, Massachusetts, began investigating uses for the new technology of stereophonic television broadcasting, particularly multichannel television sound (MTS), which allowed for a third audio channel, called the Secondary Audio Program (SAP). With a history of developing closed captioning of programs for hearing-impaired viewers, WGBH considered the viability of using the new audio channel for narrated descriptions of key visual elements, much like those being done for live theatre in Washington, D.C., by Margaret Pfanstiehl, who had been experimenting with television description as part of her Washington Ear radio reading service.

After reviewing and conducting various studies, which found that blind and visually impaired people were consuming more television than ever but finding the activity problematic (often relying on sighted family and friends to describe for them), WGBH consulted more closely with Pfanstiehl and her husband, Cody, and then conducted its first tests of DVS in Boston in 1986. These tests (broadcasting to local groups of people of various ages and visual impairments) and further study were successful enough to merit a grant from the Corporation for Public Broadcasting to complete plans to establish the DVS organization permanently in 1988. After national testing, more feedback, more development of description technique, and additional grants, DVS became a regular feature of selected PBS programming in 1990. Later, DVS became an available feature in some films and home videos, including DVDs.

=== Technique ===
DVS describers watch a program and write a script describing visual elements which are important in understanding what is occurring at the time and the plot as a whole. For example, for the main character of the children's series Arthur on PBS, the description has been performed as follows:

"Arthur is an 8-year-old aardvark. He wears round glasses with thick frames over his big eyes. He has two round ears on top of his oval-shaped head. He wears red sneakers and blue jeans, with a yellow sweater over a white shirt."

The length of descriptions and their placement by a producer into the program are largely dictated by what can fit in natural pauses in dialogue (other producers of description may have other priorities, such as synchronization with the timing of a described element's appearance, which differ from DVS's priority for detail). Once recorded, placed and mixed with a copy of the original soundtrack, the DVS track is then "laid back" to the master tape on a separate audio track (for broadcast on the SAP) or to its own DVS master (for home video). For feature films, the descriptions are not mixed with the soundtrack, but kept separate as part of a DTS soundtrack.

=== FCC involvement ===
When the Federal Communications Commission (FCC) started establishing various requirements for broadcasters in larger markets to improve their accessibility to audiences with hearing and vision impairments, DVS branched out to non-PBS programming, and soon description could be heard on the SAP for shows such as CSI: Crime Scene Investigation and The Simpsons. However, a federal court ruled in 2002 that the Federal Communications Commission had exceeded its jurisdiction by requiring broadcasters in the top 25 markets to carry video description.

Since that time, the amount of new DVS television programming in the United States declined, as did access to information regarding upcoming described programming, while broadcasters like ABC and Fox instead decided to devote their SAP channels to Spanish language dubbing tracks of their shows rather than DVS due to the technical limitations of the analog NTSC standard. Description by DVS and other producers was still available in a limited form on television (the greatest percentage of DVS programming is still on PBS). WGBH's Media Access Group continues supporting description of feature films (known as DVS Theatrical) and DVS home videos/DVDs are available from WGBH as well as other vendors and libraries. Commercial caption providers the National Captioning Institute and CaptionMax have also begun to describe programs. Benefit Media, Inc., a subsidiary of DuArt Film and Video in New York City provides DVS services to USA Network. For the 2016 Summer Olympics, NBC provided description of events during the network's primetime block.

The 21st Century Communications and Video Accessibility Act of 2010 reinstates the FCC's involvement in providing rules for video description. Under the rules, affiliates in the top 25 markets and the top five-rated cable networks will have to provide at least 50 hours of video described programming per quarter; the rules took effect on July 1, 2012. However, this provision currently does not apply to syndicated programming; notably, many programs which have audio description in their network runs, such as those produced by 20th Television, remove the DVS track for syndication, substituting in the Spanish dubbing track on SAP to reach more viewers, though as many stations affiliated with "netlets" like The CW and MyNetworkTV are not under the video description provision, do not have SAP channels and thus, neither an audio description or Spanish dub track can be heard. In some markets where SAP is activated on affiliate stations though, The CW had provided a Spanish SAP dub for Jane the Virgin through the series' entire run, and audio description is available and passed through for their Saturday morning One Magnificent Morning E/I block, which is done for all of the blocks produced for the major broadcast networks by Hearst Media Production Group. In 2019, the first primetime series with DVS for the network, In the Dark (which has a blind protagonist), was launched (the series' description propagated to its Netflix run several weeks after it was placed on that service after the first-season finale). MyNetworkTV has no provisions for audio description or language dub tracks, despite many of its scripted series having DVS tracks.

Online streaming services such as Hulu and the services of television networks themselves such as CBS All Access have yet to carry descriptive video service audio in most cases as they instead are currently focused on adding closed captioning to their libraries (the network app for ABC began to carry existing audio described shows in the fall of 2017). Netflix committed in April 2015 to begin audio description of their original series, starting with Daredevil (which features a blind protagonist with other heightened senses) and the remainder of their original programming in the next few months, making their goal in that timeframe, along with providing the DVS tracks of existing series in their library; however some platforms (mainly older versions for devices that are now unsupported) do not provide the alternate audio.

ABC, along with sister network Disney Channel has since added audio description to some of their programming (with a commensurate decline in Spanish-dubbed programming, though the ATSC standard allows more audio channels), but does not contract any of their shows to be described by the Media Access Group, instead going with commercial providers CaptionMax (now a part of 3Play Media), Audio Eyes, and Deluxe. Some special programming such as Toy Story of Terror! and Toy Story That Time Forgot is described by the Media Access Group under existing contracts with Walt Disney Pictures and Pixar Animation Studios (which would conclude with Incredibles 2 in 2018, with future releases being described by Deluxe). NBC and their associated cable networks, along with outside productions by Universal Television such as Brooklyn Nine-Nine and The Mindy Project, solely use 3Play Media for description services; Netflix currently uses Deluxe primarily for their original series, while going per studio for acquired programming. Hulu's original series are currently described by Point.360. Most scripted programming on Fox, except for the shows of Gordon Ramsay (Hell's Kitchen, Hotel Hell and Kitchen Nightmares) The Simpsons (starting with season 33), and American Dad! (starting with season 22) is described by the Media Access Group; Ramsay's programs are contracted by his producing studio to have audio description done by Scottish-born voiceover artist Mhairi Morrison with Descriptive Video Works; The Simpsons switched to Deluxe starting with season 33, and American Dad!'s descriptions are done by Verbit. Unique to most described shows, Fox's Empire uses actress Adrienne Barbeau for their description. CBS's described shows all use the Media Access Group. Described shows on Viacom networks (such as Nickelodeon, Nick Jr and Comedy Central) typically have descriptions handled by the studio that provided closed captioning. For example, ChalkZone and Ned's Declassified School Survival Guide use the National Captioning Institute (under NCI Described Media), Rugrats (including its spin-off series All Grown Up!) and The Adventures of Jimmy Neutron, Boy Genius use the Media Access Group, and South Park,Wow! Wow! Wubbzy! and Pinky Dinky Doo use CaptionMax.

Some shows have lost their DVS during their original network runs due to outside factors or complications. For instance, American Dad! had a two-season interregnum in part of season 12 and all of season 13 without any DVS service during its move from Fox to TBS in late 2014, before it returned in November 2016 for its fourteenth season. The Mindy Project lost DVS at the start of their fourth season upon the move to Hulu, which did not yet provide DVS service. Cartoon Network and their time-share partner Adult Swim began to pass-through DVS for their syndicated content in the last quarter of 2018.

== See also ==
- Novelization
- Radio drama
- TheatreVision

== General and cited references ==
- Cronin, Barry J. Ph.D. and Robertson King, Sharon, MA. "The Development of the Descriptive Video Service", Report for the National Center to Improve Practice. Retrieved on July 30, 2007.
- "The ABC's of DVS ", WGBH - Media Access Group. Retrieved on July 30, 2007.
- "Our Inclusive Approach ", AudioVision. Retrieved on July 30, 2007.
- DVS FAQ, WGBH - Media Access Group. Retrieved on July 30, 2007.
- "Media Access Guide Volume 3", WGBH - Media Access Group. Retrieved on July 30, 2007.
- "ACB Statement on Video Description" American Council for the Blind Legislative Seminar 2006, February 1, 2006. Retrieved from Audio Description International on July 30, 2007.
- List of PBS series with DVS, August 2007, WGBH - Media Access Group. Retrieved on July 30, 2007.
- Homepage, MoPix. Retrieved on July 30, 2007.
- "DVS Home Video" WGBH - Media Access Group. Retrieved on July 30, 2007.
