= Alan Newell (English computer scientist) =

- Education: University of Birmingham (Ph.D. & B.S.)
- Known for: HCI research for the elderly and people with disabilities
- Awards: CHI Social Impact Award (2011)
- Scientific career
- Fields: Human–computer interaction

Alan Newell is an emeritus professor at Dundee University who has a long history of human-computer interaction research, with a focus on supporting the elderly and people with disabilities. He is also the founder of the School of Computing at Dundee University, where he established one of the world's largest academic groups dedicated to researching and improving digital systems for the elderly and people with disabilities, the Queen Mother Research Centre.

He was involved in some of the early development of closed captioning in the UK.
