= Electronic program guide =

Television term

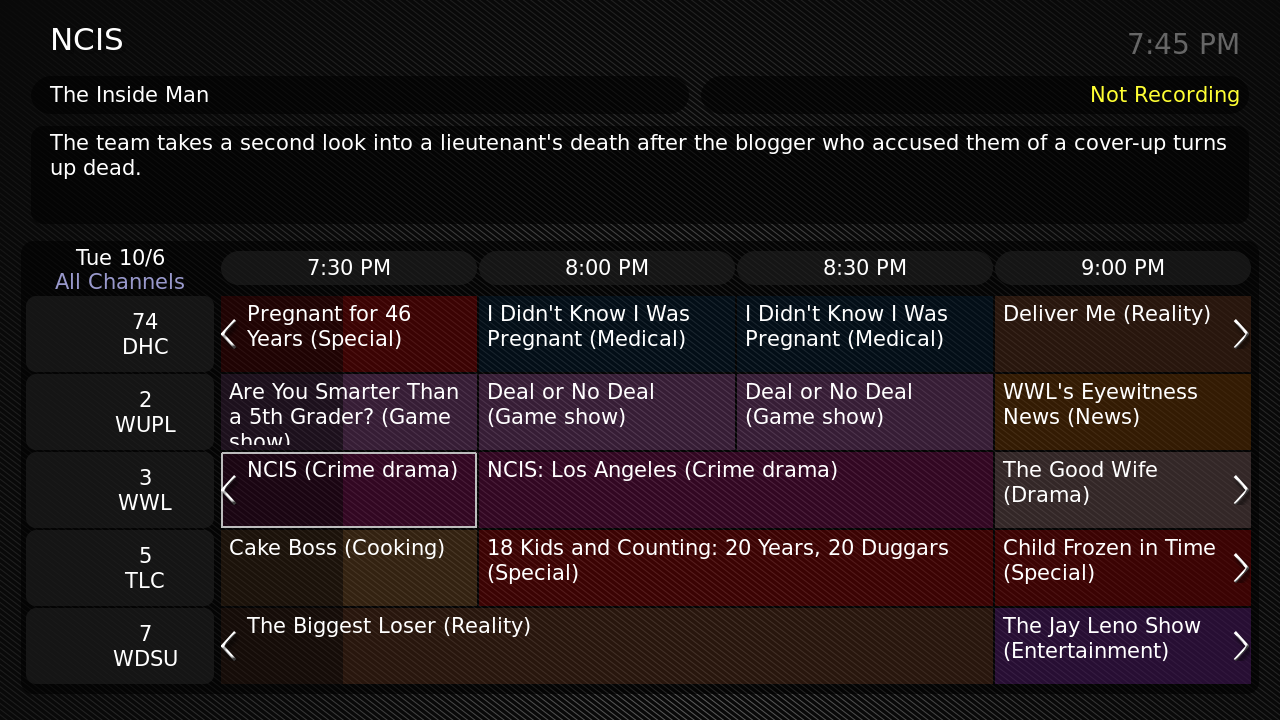
Electronic programming guide interface in MythTV. Including networks, DHC, and TLC, and local TV stations WUPL, WWL, and WDSU.

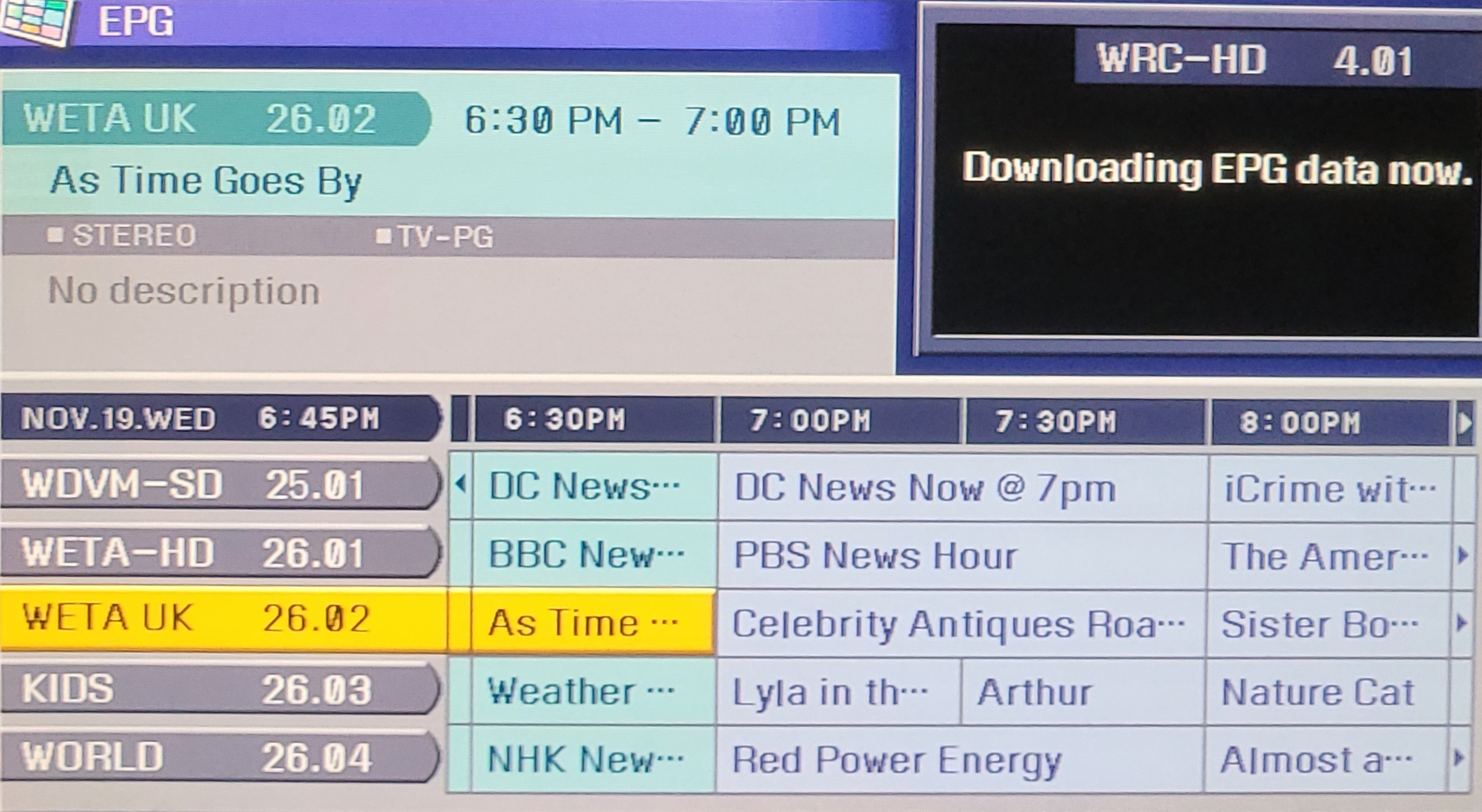
Electronic programming guide from a Pioneer plasma HDTV made in 2003

Electronic programming guides (EPGs) and interactive programming guides (IPGs) are menu-based systems that provide users of television, radio, and other media applications with continuously updated menus that display scheduling information for current and upcoming broadcast programming (most commonly, TV listings). Some guides also feature backward scrolling to promote their catch up content. They are commonly known as guides or TV guides.

Non-interactive electronic programming guides (sometimes known as "navigation software") are typically available for television and radio, and consist of a digitally displayed, non-interactive menu of programming scheduling information shown by a cable or satellite television provider to its viewers on a dedicated channel. EPGs are transmitted by specialized video character generation (CG) equipment housed within each such provider's central headend facility. By tuning into an EPG channel, a menu is displayed that lists current and upcoming television shows on all available channels.

A more modern form of the EPG, associated with both television and radio broadcasting, is the interactive [electronic] programming guide (IPG, though often referred to as EPG). An IPG allows television viewers and radio listeners to navigate scheduling information menus interactively, selecting and discovering programming by time, title, channel or genre using an input device such as a keypad, computer keyboard or television remote control. Its interactive menus are generated entirely within local receiving or display equipment using raw scheduling data sent by individual broadcast stations or centralized scheduling information providers. A typical IPG provides information covering a span of seven or 14 days.

Data used to populate an interactive EPG may be distributed over the Internet, either for a charge or free of charge, and implemented on equipment connected directly or through a computer to the Internet.

Television-based IPGs in conjunction with Programme Delivery Control (PDC) technology can also facilitate the selection of TV shows for recording with digital video recorders (DVRs), also known as personal video recorders (PVRs).

== History ==
=== Key events ===
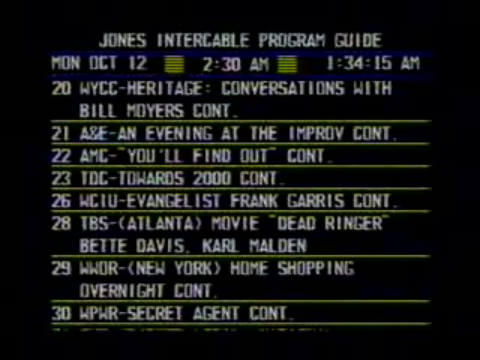
The EPG Channel, an electronic program guide (EPG) from 1987.

==== North America ====
In 1981, United Video Satellite Group launched the first EPG service in North America, a cable channel known simply as The Electronic Program Guide. It allowed cable systems in the United States and Canada to provide on-screen listings to their subscribers 24 hours a day (displaying programming information up to 90 minutes in advance) on a dedicated cable channel. Raw listings data for the service was supplied via satellite to participating cable systems, each of which installed a computer within its headend facility to present that data to subscribers in a format customized to the system's unique channel lineup. The EPG Channel would later be renamed Prevue Guide and go on to serve as the de facto EPG service for North American cable systems throughout the remainder of the 1980s, the entirety of the 1990s, and – as TV Guide Network or TV Guide Channel – for the first decade of the 21st century.

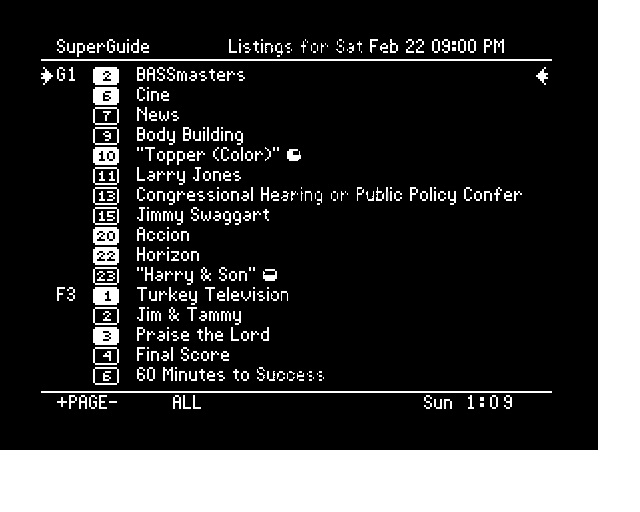
SuperGuide from 1986

In 1986 at a trade show in Nashville, STV/Onsat, a print programming guide publisher, introduced SuperGuide, an interactive electronic programming guide for home satellite dish viewers. The system was the focus of a 1987 article in STV Magazine. The original system had a black-and-white display, and would locally store programming information for around one week in time. A remote control was used to interact with the unit. When the user found a show they wanted to watch, they would have to turn off the guide and then tune the satellite receiver to the correct service. The system was developed by Chris Schultheiss of STV/OnSat and engineer Peter Hallenbeck. The guide information was distributed by satellite using the home owner's dish as the receiver. The information was stored locally so that the user could use the guide without having to be on a particular satellite or service.

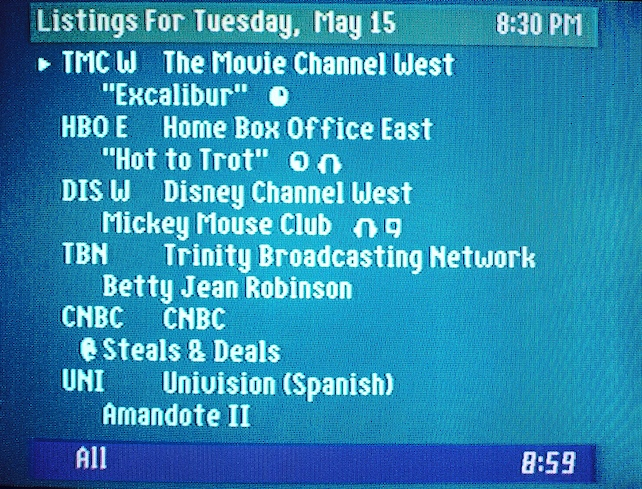
2nd generation SuperGuide screen, 1990.

In March 1990, a second generation SuperGuide system was introduced that was integrated into the Uniden 4800 receiver. This version had a color display and the hardware was based on a custom chip; it was also able to disseminate up to two weeks of programming information. When the user found the show of interest, they pressed a button on the remote and the receiver tuned to the show they wanted to watch. This unit also had a single button recording function, and controlled VCRs via an infrared output. Available in North America, it was the first commercially available unit for home use that had a locally stored guide integrated with the receiver for single button viewing and taping. A presentation on the system was given at the 1990 IEEE consumer electronics symposium in Chicago.

In June 1988 a patent was awarded that concerned the implementation of a searchable electronic program guide – an interactive program guide (IPG).

TV Guide Magazine and Liberty Media established a joint venture in 1992 known as TV Guide On Screen to develop an EPG. The joint venture was led by video game veteran, Bruce Davis, and introduced an interactive program guide to the market in late 1995 in the General Instrument CFT2200 set-top cable box. Leading competitors to TV Guide On Screen included Prevue Guide and StarSight Telecast. Telecommunications Inc, owner of Liberty Media, acquired United Video Satellite Group, owner of Prevue Guide, in 1995. TV Guide On Screen and Prevue Guide were later merged. TV Guide On Screen for digital cable set top boxes premiered in the DigiCable series of set top boxes from General Instrument shortly thereafter. See wiki on TV Guide for subsequent developments.

Scientific Atlanta introduced the 8600X Advanced analog Set-top box in 1993 that included an interactive electronic program guide, downloadable software, 2-way communications, and pause/FF/REW for VCR-like viewing. Millions were deployed by Time Warner and other customers.

==== Western Europe ====
In Western Europe, 59 million television households were equipped with EPGs at the end of 2008, a penetration of 36% of all television households. The situation varies from country to country, depending on the status of digitization and the role of pay television and IPTV in each market. With Sky as an early mover and the BBC iPlayer and Virgin Media as ambitious followers, the United Kingdom is the most developed and innovative EPG market to date, with 96% of viewers having frequently used an EPG in 2010. Inview Technology is one of the UK's largest and oldest EPG producers, dating back to 1996 and currently in partnership with Humax and Skyworth.

Scandinavia also is a highly innovative EPG market. Even in Italy, the EPG penetration is relatively high with 38%. In France, IPTV is the main driver of EPG developments. In contrast to many other European countries, Germany lags behind, due to a relatively slow digitization process and the minor role of pay television in that country.

== Current applications ==
Interactive program guides are nearly ubiquitous in most broadcast media today. EPGs can be made available through television (on set-top boxes and all current digital TV receivers), mobile phones (particularly through smartphone apps), and on the Internet. Online TV Guides are becoming more ubiquitous, with over seven million searches for "TV Guide" being logged each month on Google.

For television, IPG support is built into almost all modern receivers for digital cable, digital satellite, and over-the-air digital broadcasting. They are also commonly featured in digital video recorders such as TiVo and MythTV. Higher-end receivers for digital broadcast radio and digital satellite radio commonly feature built-in IPGs as well.

Demand for non-interactive electronic television program guides – television channels displaying listings for currently airing and upcoming programming – has been nearly eliminated by the widespread availability of interactive program guides for television; TV Guide Network, the largest of these services, eventually abandoned its original purpose as a non-interactive EPG service and became a traditional general entertainment cable channel, eventually rebranding as Pop in January 2015. Television-based IPGs provide the same information as EPGs, but faster and often in much more detail. When television IPGs are supported by PVRs, they enable viewers to plan viewing and recording by selecting broadcasts directly from the EPG, rather than programming timers.

The aspect of an IPG most noticed by users is its graphical user interface (GUI), typically a grid or table listing channel names and program titles and times: web and television-based IPG interfaces allow the user to highlight any given listing and call up additional information about it supplied by the EPG provider. Programs on offer from subchannels may also be listed.

Typical IPGs also allow users the option of searching by genre, as well as immediate one-touch access to, or recording of, a selected program. Reminders and parental control functions are also often included. The IPGs within some DirecTV IRDs can control a VCR using an attached infrared emitter that emulates its remote control.

The latest development in IPGs is personalization through a recommendation engine or semantics. Semantics are used to permit interest-based suggestions to one or several viewers on what to watch or record based on past patterns. One such IPG, iFanzy, allows users to customize its appearance.

Standards for delivery of scheduling information to television-based IPGs vary from application to application, and by country. Older television IPGs like Guide Plus+ relied on analog technology (such as the vertical blanking interval of analog television video signals) to distribute listings data to IPG-enabled consumer receiving equipment. In Europe, the European Telecommunications Standards Institute (ETSI) published standard ETS 300 707 to standardize the delivery of IPG data over digital television broadcast signals. Listings data for IPGs integrated into digital terrestrial television and radio receivers of the present day is typically sent within each station's MPEG transport stream, or alongside it in a special data stream. The ATSC standard for digital terrestrial television, for instance, uses tables sent in each station's PSIP. These tables are meant to contain program start times and titles along with additional program descriptive metadata. Current time signals are also included for on-screen display purposes, and they are also used to set timers on recording devices.

Devices embedded within modern digital cable and satellite television receivers, on the other hand, customarily rely upon third-party listings metadata aggregators to provide them with their on-screen listings data. Such companies include Tribune TV Data (now Gracenote, part of Nielsen Holdings), Gemstar-TV Guide (now TiVo Corporation), FYI Television, Inc. in the United States and Europe; TV Media in the United States and Canada; Broadcasting Dataservices in Europe and Dayscript in Latin America; and What's On India Media Pvt. Ltd in India, Sri Lanka, Indonesia, the Middle East and Asia.

Some IPG systems built into older set-top boxes designed to receive terrestrial digital signals and television sets with built-in digital tuners may have a lesser degree of interactive features compared to those included in cable, satellite and IPTV converters; technical limitations in these models may prevent users from accessing program listings beyond (at maximum) 16 hours in advance and complete program synopses, and the inability for the IPG to parse synopses for certain programs from the MPEG stream or displaying next-day listings until at or after 12:00 a.m. local time. IPGs built into newer television (including Smart TV), digital terrestrial set-top box and antenna-ready DVR models feature on-screen displays and interactive guide features more comparable to their pay television set-top counterparts, including the ability to display grids and, in the case of DVRs intended for terrestrial use, the ability – with an Internet connection – to access listings and content from over-the-top services.

A growing trend is for manufacturers such as Elgato and Topfield and software developers such as Microsoft in their Windows Media Center to use an Internet connection to acquire data for their built-in IPGs. This enables greater interactivity with the IPG such as media downloads, series recording and programming of the recordings for the IPG remotely; for example, IceTV in Australia enables TiVo-like services to competing DVR/PVR manufacturers and software companies.

In developing IPG software, manufacturers must include functions to address the growing volumes of increasingly complex data associated with programming. This data includes program descriptions, schedules and parental television ratings, along with flags for technical and access features such as display formats, closed captioning and Descriptive Video Service. They must also include user configuration information such as favorite channel lists, and multimedia content. To meet this need, some set-top box software designs incorporate a "database layer" that utilizes either proprietary functions or a commercial off-the-shelf embedded database system for sorting, storing and retrieving programming data.

== See also ==
- Digital video recorders
- NexTView
- Teletext
- TV Genius
- Video on demand
- MythTV
- Schedules Direct
