= Kinesis (keyboard) =

Ergonomic computer keyboards brand

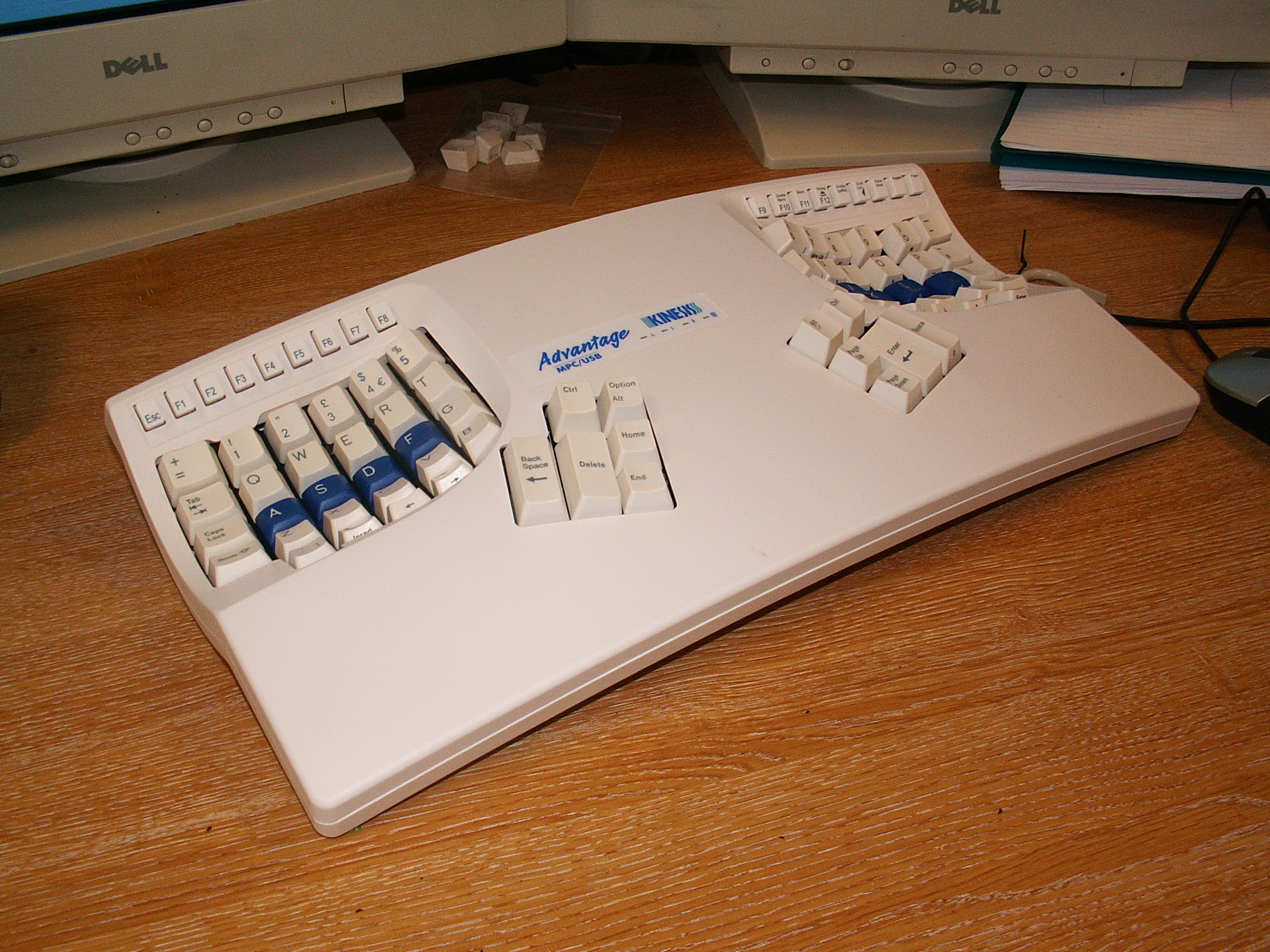
The Kinesis Advantage keyboard

Kinesis is a company based near Seattle that offers computer keyboards with ergonomic designs as alternatives to the traditional keyboard design. Most widely known among these are the contoured Advantage line, which features recessed keys in two bucket-like hollows to allow the user's fingers to reach keys with less effort. Moreover, the keys are laid out in perfect vertical rows to avoid the need for lateral movements during typing. In addition, the modifiers such as enter, alt, backspace, control, etc. are moved to a central location so they can be pressed with the stronger thumbs rather than the pinky fingers.

== Corporate history ==
Kinesis was founded in 1991 with its headquarters in Bothell, Washington, a suburb of Seattle. The company released its first keyboard, the Model 100 (first in the long-running Contoured/Advantage line), in 1992. Kinesis's first adjustable keyboard, the Maxim, was released in 1997.

In 2000, Kinesis entered a strategic alliance with Cramer, Inc. of Kansas City, which manufactured ergonomic seating. Kinesis took over production for the Cramer Interfaces chair arm-mounted split keyboard, releasing a revised version as the Kinesis Evolution in 2001.

== Products ==
Kinesis keyboard lines
Line		Image	Mechanical keyswitch	Interfaces		Layout			Programmable	Notes / Refs
Name	Models	Image	Mechanical keyswitch	Computer	Pedal	Adjustable split	Vertical columns	Contour	Programmable	Notes / Refs
Contoured	KB1x0, KB13xPC(/QD), KB333PC		Yes Cherry MX brown	PS/2	RJ11	fixed	Yes	Yes	Classic, Professional	
Maxim	KB200, KB210USB		No (dome)	USB & PS/2		limited	No	No	No	
Evolution	KB4xx		Yes (tactile)	PS/2 (+USB for dual touchpad)		Yes	No	No	Yes	
Advantage	KB5x0USB(/QD)		Yes Cherry MX brown, red	USB	RJ11	fixed	Yes	Yes	Yes	
Advantage	(Advantage2); KB6xx		Yes Cherry MX brown, red	USB	RJ11	fixed	Yes	Yes	Yes	
Freestyle	KB700		No (dome)	USB		Yes	No	No	Yes	
Freestyle	(Freestyle2); KB800PB, KB800PB-BT		No (dome)	USB (Bluetooth on "Blue" model)		Yes	No	No	Yes	
Freestyle	(FreestylePro); KB900		Yes Cherry MX brown, red	USB		Yes	No	No	Yes	
Freestyle	(Freestyle Edge & Edge RGB); KB950 & KB975		Yes Cherry MX blue, brown, red, silver	USB		Yes	No	No	Yes	
Advantage 360	KB360		Yes (Gateron)	USB-C (Bluetooth)		Yes	Yes	Yes	Yes SmartSet / ZMK	

=== Contoured / Advantage ===
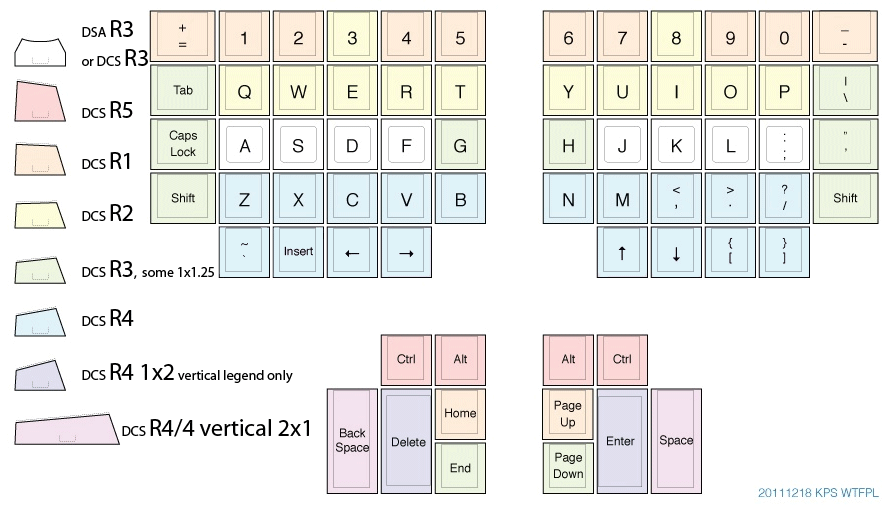
Kinesis contoured keyboard, default layout

The original Model 100, released in 1992, featured a single-piece contoured design similar to the Maltron keyboard, with the keys laid out in a traditional QWERTY arrangement, separated into two clusters for the left and right hands. A 1993 article in PC Magazine described the US$690 (equivalent to $1,500 in 2025) keyboard's arrangement as having "the alphabet keys in precisely vertical (not diagonal) columns in two concave depressions. The Kinesis Keyboard also puts the Backspace, Delete, Enter, Space, Ctrl, Alt, Home, End, Page Up, and Page Down keys under your thumbs in the middle".

The top row of keys, including the escape key and function keys, are small soft-touch keys with membrane dome switches. The remaining keys are standard size and each has its own Cherry MX brown key switch, providing a tactile feel, but no click. A piezo buzzer provides optional key click. All Kinesis contoured keyboards (except the Essential) support the capability to re-map individual keys. Recent models also come with the ability to switch between the Dvorak layout with the press of a special key combination, though keycaps printed with dual-legend QWERTY/Dvorak letters are included only on specific models.

By 1995, Kinesis had released its fourth-generation Model 130. In 1996, Kinesis added two sub-lines to its contoured keyboards: the Essential (introduced that June), which was not programmable but could be upgraded, and the Professional (November), which included on-board macro programming, a foot switch, and Keyware software for Windows. The Essential had a suggested retail price of US$265 (equivalent to $540 in 2025) while the Professional was more expensive at US$395 (equivalent to $810 in 2025). In July 1997, the mid-range Classic sub-line was launched to replace the Model 130, offering key remapping and macro programmability, but with half the memory of the Professional. Specific model numbers included the Essential (KB132PC), Classic (KB133PC), and Professional (KB134PC); Classic and Professional models also were available with QWERTY/Dvorak dual-legend keys (KB133PC/QD and KB134PC/QD, respectively). The Ergo Elan (KB333PC) was launched in 1999 with a revised (U.S. International) layout to accommodate European and Japanese users; it has basic programmability, corresponding to the capabilities of the Classic.

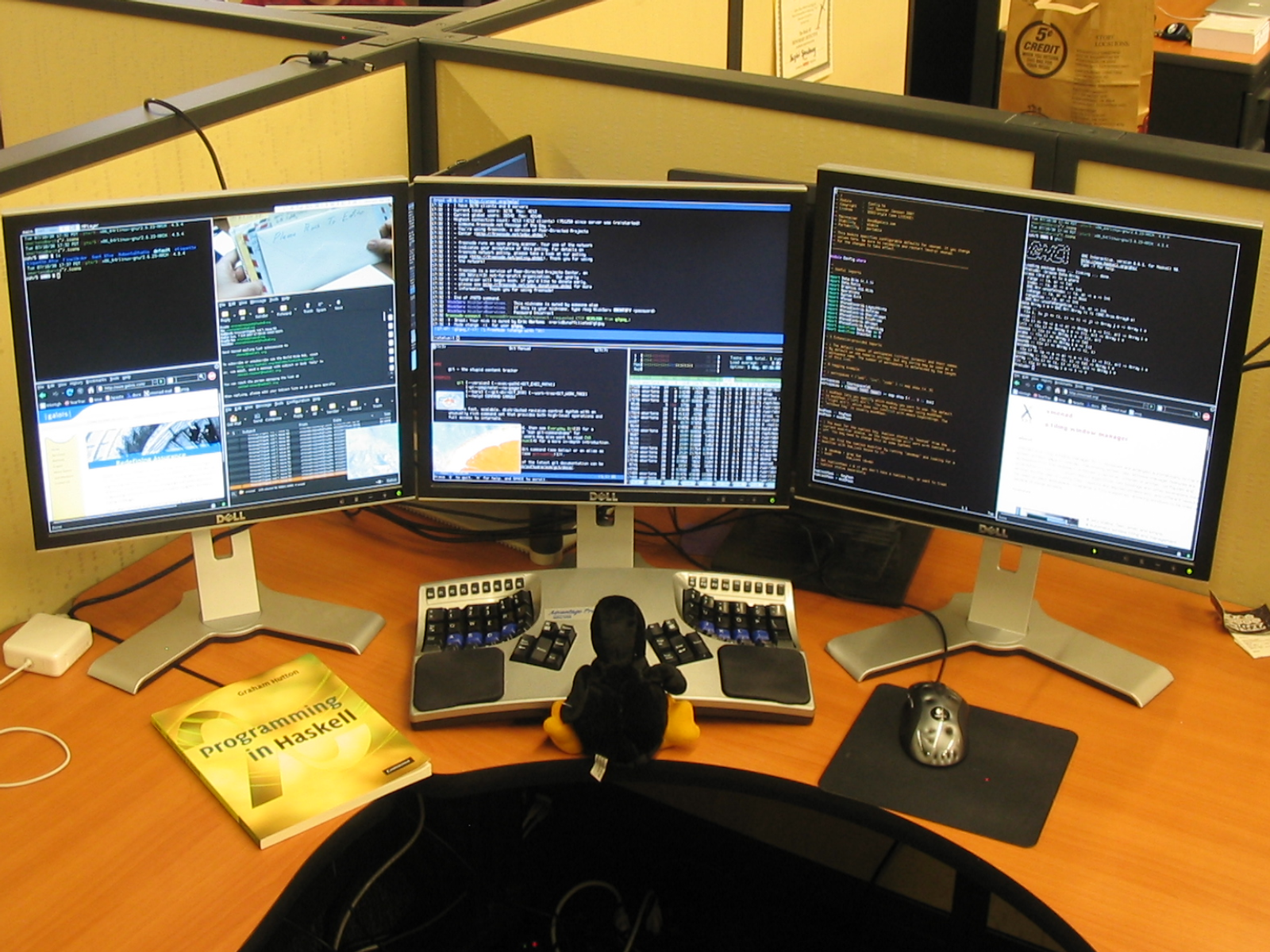
Kinesis Contoured Advantage Pro employed in conjunction with tiling window manager xmonad

In 2002, Kinesis released the Advantage line, updating its contoured keyboards with a USB interface. The non-programmable model was dropped and the USB contoured keyboards were available in two versions: the Advantage was offered in black or white and the Advantage Pro had a metallic silver finish with black keys. Specific models included the Advantage MPC (KB500USB) and Advantage Pro MPC (KB510USB); MPC indicates Macintosh and PC compability. The Advantage MPC model also was available with QWERTY/Dvorak dual-legend keys (KB500USB/QD) and in a version (KB500USB-LF) that uses Cherry MX red linear keyswitches.

The Advantage2 line was released in 2016; one major change was implementing mechanical Cherry ML keyswitches for the function key row. Internally, the Advantage2 had a new "SmartSet" engine and expanded memory for macro programming. Like the preceding Advantage, the Advantage2 has options for dual-printed keycaps and low-force Cherry MX red keyswitches.

=== Maxim ===
The Maxim adjustable keyboard was launched in 1997 to compete with similar adjustable staggered-column keyboards with split halves and/or tenting such as the Apple Adjustable, Microsoft Natural, and IBM Adjustable (M15)/Lexmark Select-Ease keyboards. The front/back slope (6° and 12°), rotation (0–30°), and lateral tenting (0°, 8°, 14°) were adjustable to accommodate a wider variety of users; Kinesis advised new users to gradually increase split opening and tenting angles to acclimate to a more relaxed hand/wrist position. The Maxim is a tenkeyless QWERTY layout with the split halves bordered by F6, 6, T, G, and B on the left and F7, 7, Y, H, and N on the right; a numeric keypad with PS/2 interface was available separately. In addition, the Maxim is compatible with the Kinesis 3-action footswitch via a daisy chain connection.

As originally released, the Maxim was fitted with a PS/2 mini-DIN interface; versions compatible with Macintosh and Sun were released in bundles with interface conversion boxes. The keyboard was reconfigurable to use the Dvorak layout by selecting the appropriate driver in Windows. The accessory keypad connected using an RJ11 connector.

A USB version was released in 2004; it uses a passive adapter for PS/2 compatibility. With the USB update, the keypad was revised to incorporate a USB hub. It was named a PC Magazine Editor's Choice that year in a comparison of keyboards.

=== Savant ===
The Savant and Savant Professional were keypads with 20 and 58 unlabeled keys, respectively; each key could be programmed with up to 480 (Savant) or 915 (Savant Professional) keystrokes. They were designed and produced by P.I. Engineering and marketed by Kinesis; P.I. Engineering marketed identical products as the X-keys Desktop and Pro.

=== Interfaces / Evolution ===
The Interfaces keyboard was developed by Cramer, Inc. as a split keyboard mounted on the user's chair arms. Kinesis assumed responsibility for manufacturing the Interfaces in 2000, then released an updated version in 2001 as the Kinesis Evolution. The Evolution added programming capabilities and included a bundled touchpad pointing device that could be moved to the left or right halves. The cable connecting the keyboard to the computer was 10 ft (3.0 m) long, while the cable linking the halves was 5 ft (1.5 m); mechanical, tactile keyswitches were used. To improve flexibility, track-mounted (taking the place of an underdesk tray) and desktop configurations of the Evolution were released. The specific model number depends on the mount style chosen and the trackpad options, which were for the left, right, or both sides.

=== Freestyle ===
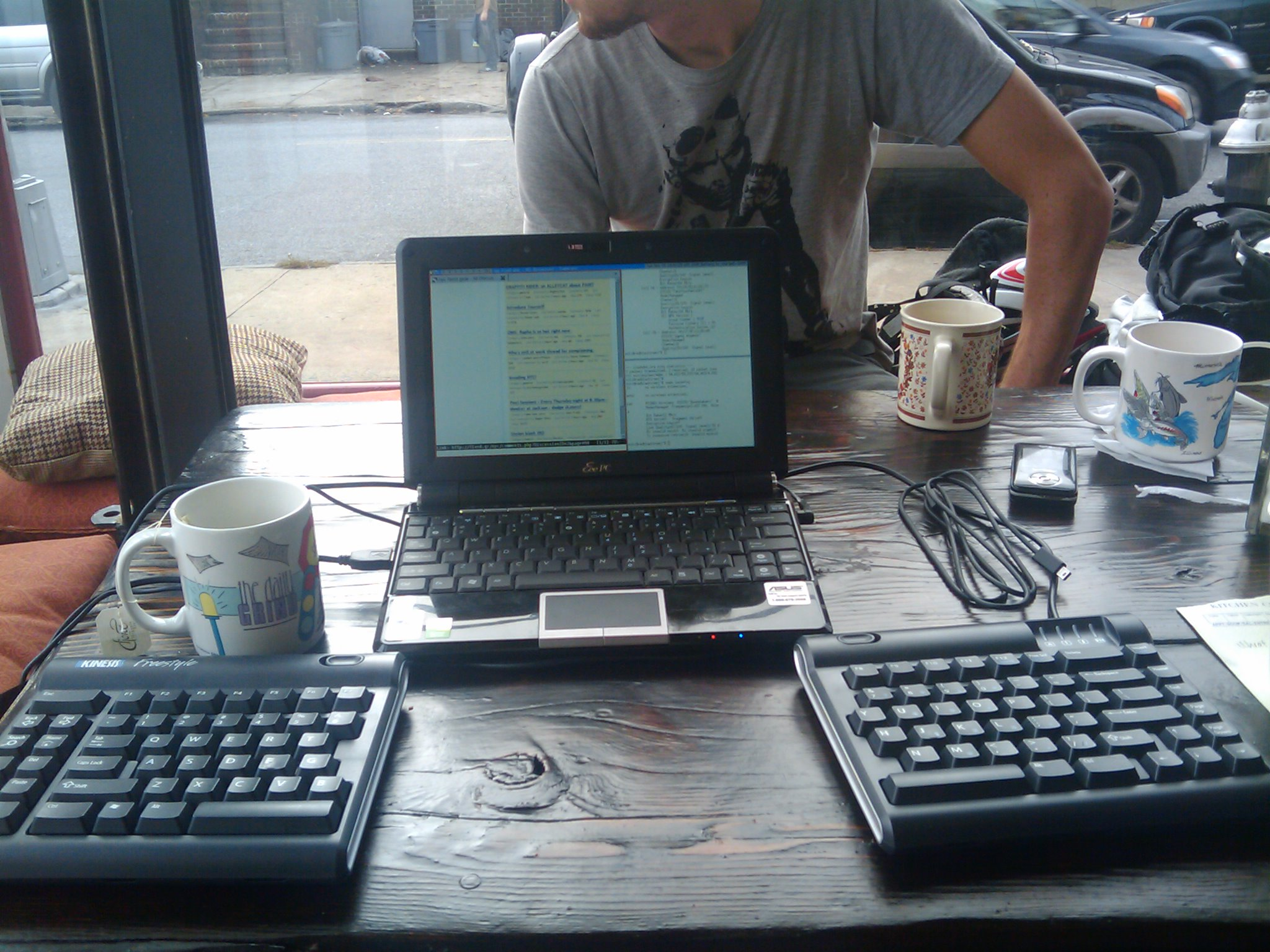
Kinesis Freestyle and laptop

The Freestyle keyboard line was launched in 2007; like the Maxim, the Freestyle was a staggered-column keyboard split into two halves, but each half was an independent module now, linked by a cable. The keyboard halves were sold as the Freestyle Solo, and was bundled with the PivotTether, which allowed any arbitrary split angle. Initially, several additional accessories were released with the Solo, including palm rests (AC706), the Incline (AC710, a base providing a fixed 10° tenting angle and adjustable split angle) and the VIP (AC720, adjustable 10°/15° tenting angle via lifters on each half). The next year, V3 (AC730) and Ascent (AC740) tenting accessories were also offered; the V3 allowed tenting angles of 5, 10, and 15° without palm rests, and the Ascent provided tenting from 20–90° in 10° increments. Also that year, Kinesis released a version of the Freestyle for Macintosh. The different versions could be distinguished by model number (KB700PB for the PC version, and KB700MW for the Macintosh version) and color (black for PC, white for Mac).

In 2012, the Freestyle2 (KB800) was introduced in PC and Mac versions; externally, the most visible improvement was a reduction in keyboard height/thickness. A matching low-profile numeric keypad was available. The Freestyle2 Blue was released in 2015, updating the Freestyle2 with a multi-channel Bluetooth wireless connection. Freestyle2 was released with an updated VIP3 (AC820) tenting accessory, but remained compatible with the V3 (AC730) and Ascent (AC740).

The Freestyle Edge was created by the Kinesis Gaming brand as a Kickstarter project in 2017; it incorporated mechanical keyswitches into the split-module Freestyle design. Backers had a choice of Cherry MX blue, brown, or red switches in a keyboard with blue backlighting. Updates followed in 2018 (Freestyle Pro, which deleted the backlighting and was aimed at business/office users with brown and red keyswitches) and 2019 (Freestyle Edge RGB, which added RGB backlighting). The Edge and Pro were released with updated VIP3 (AC910/AC925) and V3 (AC930) tenting accessories, the former bundled with palm rests.

=== Advantage 360 ===
In 2021, Kinesis announced the Advantage 360, which combined aspects of the Advantage (contoured, linear key layout) and Freestyle (individual split left/right key modules). It is available as the standard version, which uses USB-C ports to link the halves to each other and to the computer, and the Professional version, which uses Bluetooth Low Energy to link the halves together and to the computer; for the Professional, the link to the computer can be made using a USB-C cable if desired. In addition, the Professional model uses an open-source ZMK programming engine, while the regular 360 uses the Kinesis SmartSet engine. The Professional has white backlighting, while the regular 360 has none. Preorders opened in December 2021, limited to 360 reservations.

== Applications ==
The Kinesis line of keyboards are marketed to those who type throughout the work-day, and thus perceive a higher risk for such injuries as RSI. The Kinesis was first used among computer programmers, who continue to be the primary market for the devices.

=== In popular media ===
Kinesis keyboards have appeared in films and television shows, including:

- Contact (1997)
- Men in Black (1997)
- Flubber (1998)
- NetForce (1999)

== See also ==
- Dvorak keyboard layout
- Physical ergonomics
- Ergonomic keyboard
