= Ergonomic keyboard =

Computer keyboard designed with ergonomic considerations

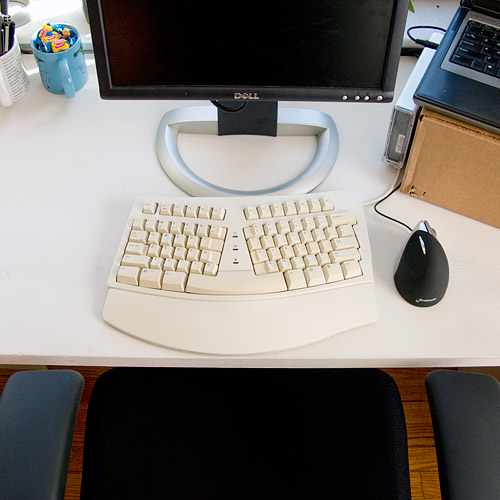
An ergonomic keyboard

Ergonomic factors when using the keyboard: hand and forearm rotation, hand slope and ulneration angle of the wrist, elbow width and shoulder rotation

An ergonomic keyboard is a computer keyboard designed with ergonomic considerations to minimize muscle strain, fatigue, and other problems.

== Features ==
The common QWERTY keyboard layout is credited to the mechanical typewriter designed by C. Latham Sholes and patented in 1878; research indicates the layout may have been influenced by telegraph operators. The offset in the columns between rows was designed to accommodate the physical links between each key and the internal mechanisms of the typewriter; as typing duties transitioned to electric (motorized) typewriters and then computers, the layout was retained to ease the transition for users that had already been trained to type. However, the legacy mechanical layout has numerous idiosyncrasies, including the staggered column layout, which can force the user into uncomfortable, repetitive movements and postures. Several potential solutions have been proposed since at least 1926.

Ergonomic keyboards, in essence, are created with the aim of minimizing the risk of discomfort (for example, in users' wrists, arms, shoulders and necks) and reducing unnecessary finger movements by rearranging or repositioning the keys to be aligned with neutral postures. For instance, typing on a conventional keyboard layout can force the user into shoulder elevation, wrist ulnar deviation, and head rotation. Consideration of physical ergonomics suggests the most relaxed typing position is one in which the keyboard user's forearms are parallel to the ground, with wrists held straight. To facilitate this posture, Klockenberg published a study in 1926 that suggested the primary key clusters for two-handed typists should be split into left and right halves which are set at an angle to each other, allowing the wrists to remain straight. A more detailed study was published in 1972 by Kroemer, suggesting that an adjustable split keyboard may reduce user pain. During the 1970s, several studies were published suggesting that data entry operators were at risk of developing musculoskeletal injuries.

=== Compact keyboard ===
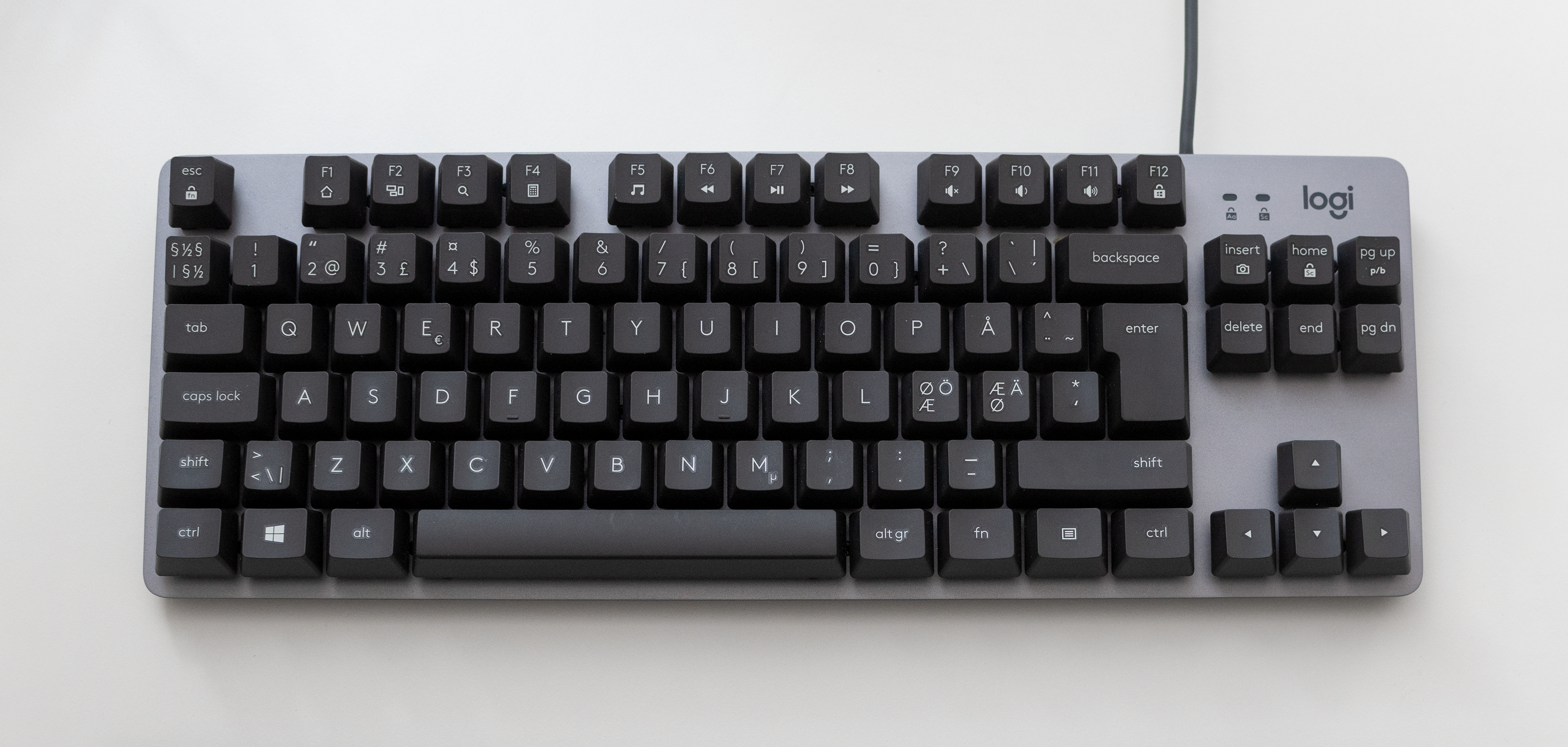
TKL keyboard

Compact keyboards lack the numeric block which is rarely used. They are considered ergonomic as it frees up space to the right side of the keyboard for better placement of the mouse. This reduces the outward rotation angle of the arm when switching to the mouse. They come in two main categories. While the ten key less (TKL) only omits the numeric block, the 75% layout changes the placement of the arrow keys as well.

Compact keyboards should not be mixed with miniature keyboards which in addition have a reduced key cap size.

=== Split key clusters ===
Split keyboards group keys into two or more sections. By separating the keyboard, split keyboards typically change the angles and the distance between each section to ensure the user's wrists remain straight. There are four relevant parameters:

Configuration parameters

Opening angle is approximately 30° in this schematic

The split, rotation, slant, or opening angle, which refers to the angle between the rows of the left and right halves. This can be imagined as the angle of rotation around an imaginary vertical axis drawn through the D and K keys of a QWERTY keyboard. Because most shoulders are wider than the hand position when placed on the home row, when using a conventional keyboard, the resulting slight shoulder adduction points the forearms inwards and requires the wrists to be bent out to position the fingers.

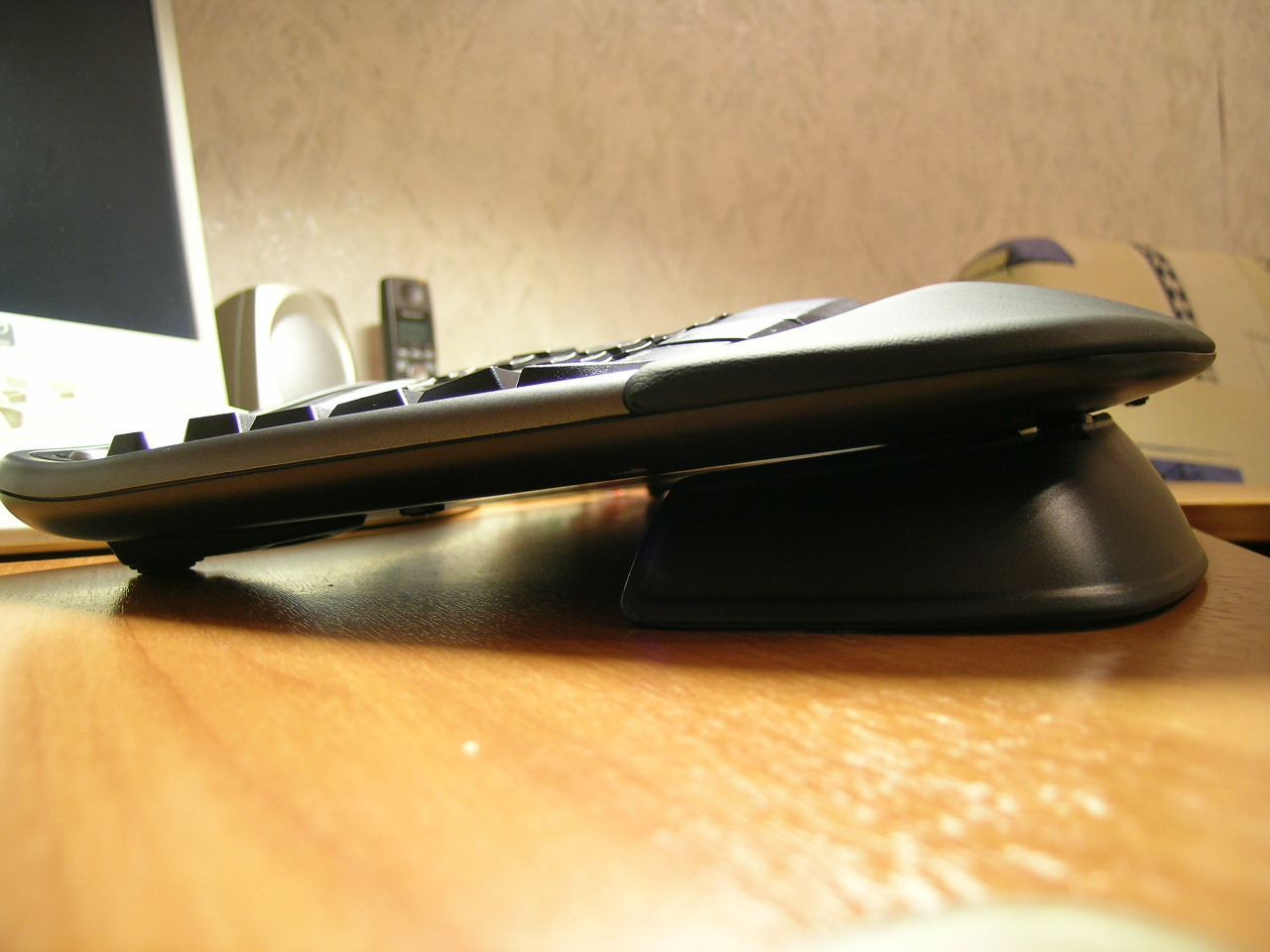
Negative slope with front riser

The slope or tilt angle, which refers to the front-to-back angle made between the plane of the keyboard and the supporting surface. This is the angle of rotation around an imaginary horizontal axis drawn through the top of the home row (ASDF / JKL; keys), i.e., from the left edge to the right edge of the keyboard. Conventional keyboards include feet that can be deployed under the top of the keyboard, which generates a positive slope: the topmost rows (F1–F12 function keys) are higher than the bottom rows (space), which would require the user to tilt their wrists up. Ergonomic keyboards may use a riser under the front to create a neutral or negative slope instead.

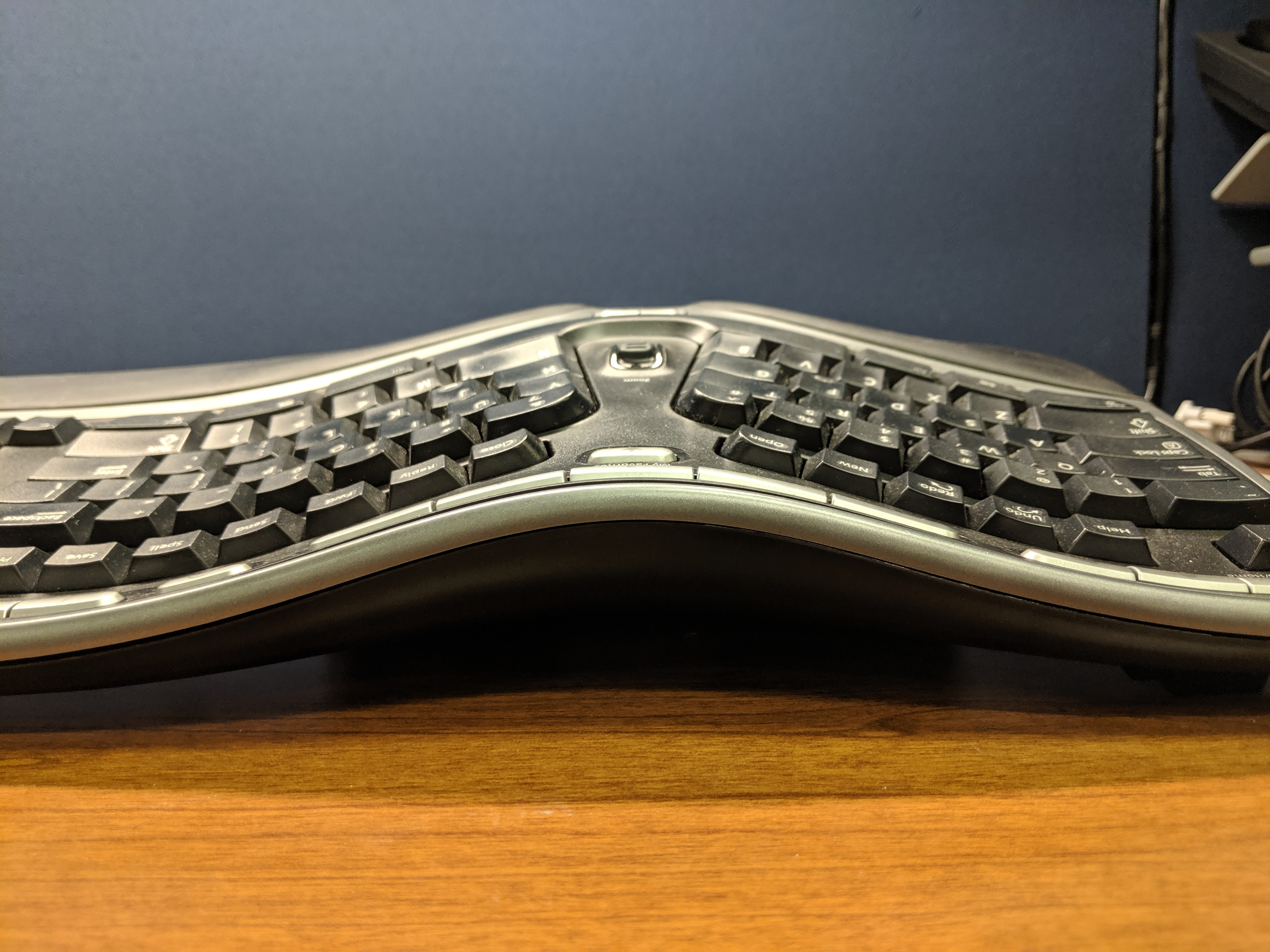
Tenting angle between the two alphanumeric halves

The lateral inclination, also known as the gable or tenting angle, which refers to the left-to-right angle between the plane of each half with the supporting surface; typically this means the center of the keyboard (inside edge of each half) is elevated compared to the outside edge. This is the angle of rotation around an imaginary horizontal axis drawn from the top center (between the 6 and 7 keys) to bottom center (middle of the space bar) of the keyboard. A conventional keyboard requires the wrists to be rotated inwards to bring the hands flat.

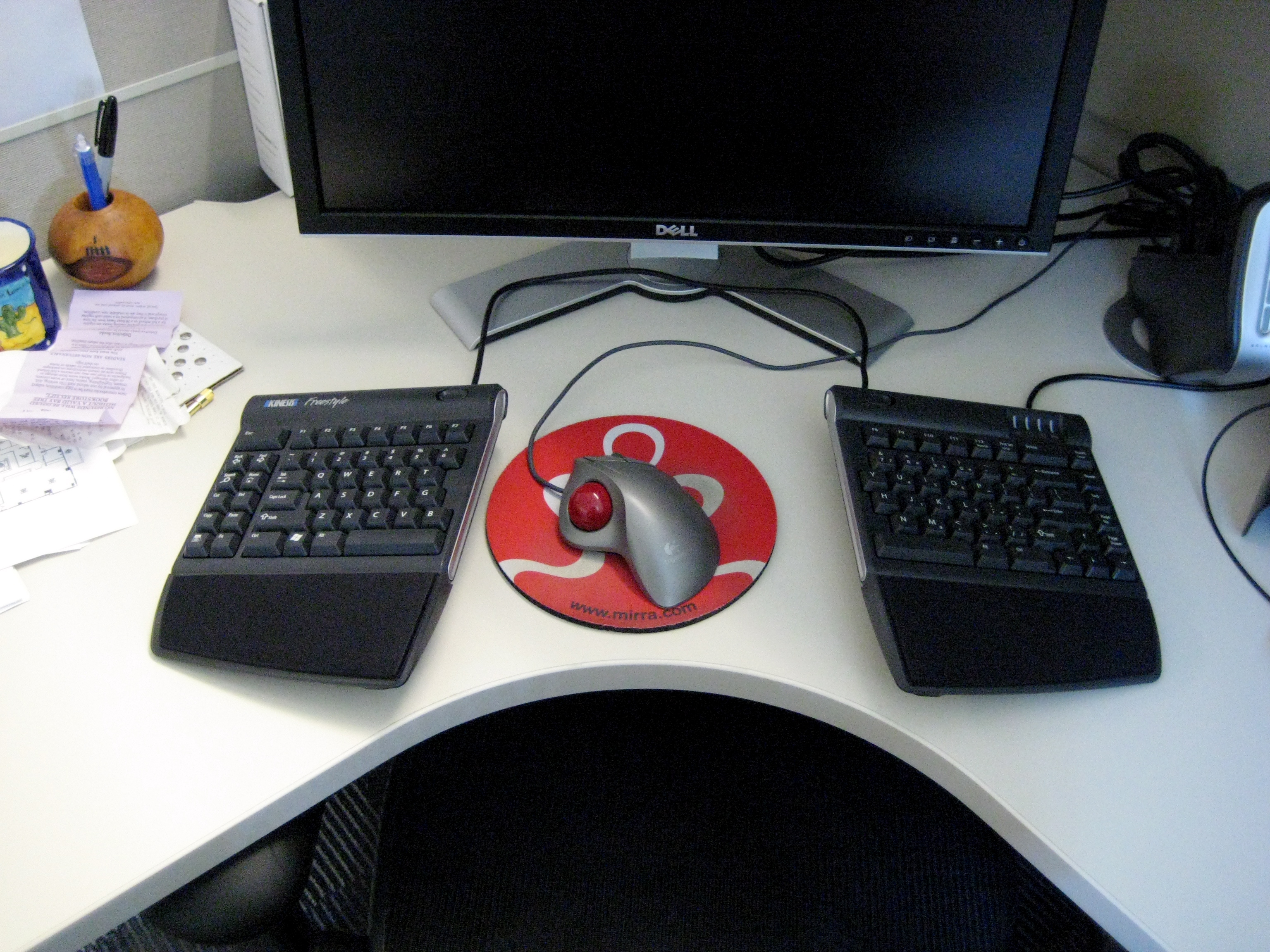
Fully split keyboards with high D-K distance

D-K distance specifies how far the section are apart. The distance between the sections usually is selected to reduce or eliminate the shoulder adduction that brings the user's hands toward the center of the keyboard, which on conventional keyboards with no opening angle can also result in an awkward wrist angle.

Ergonomic split keyboards can be fixed, where the user cannot change the relative angles and distance between the sections, or adjustable, which usually has two independent modules that allow these to be tailored exactly to the user. Fixed split keyboards are necessarily designed to accommodate a wide range of users, and can be set up rapidly to replicate a similar interface in different settings, but may not fit a specific user exactly. For example, people with broad shoulders may benefit from an adjustable split keyboard's ability to customize the distance between the two halves of the keyboard. This ensures the elbows are not too close together when typing. On the other hand, adjustable split keyboards sometimes intimidate potential users, who may fear they may exacerbate or become more susceptible to repetitive strain injuries. Due to reduced tension people might tend to a more forward neck posture; Fixed split keyboards like the Microsoft Natural have sold well in comparison.

The angled split keyboard (sometimes referred to as a Klockenburg keyboard) is similar to a split keyboard, but the middle is tented up so that the index fingers are higher than the little fingers while typing. Key Ovation makes the Goldtouch ergonomic keyboard which is an adjustable angled split keyboard. On some ergonomic keyboards, the tenting angle is increased to 90° so the user types with their hands perpendicular to the ground, thumbs-up, similar to the hand position adopted by accordion players.

A variety of split keyboards evolved over time

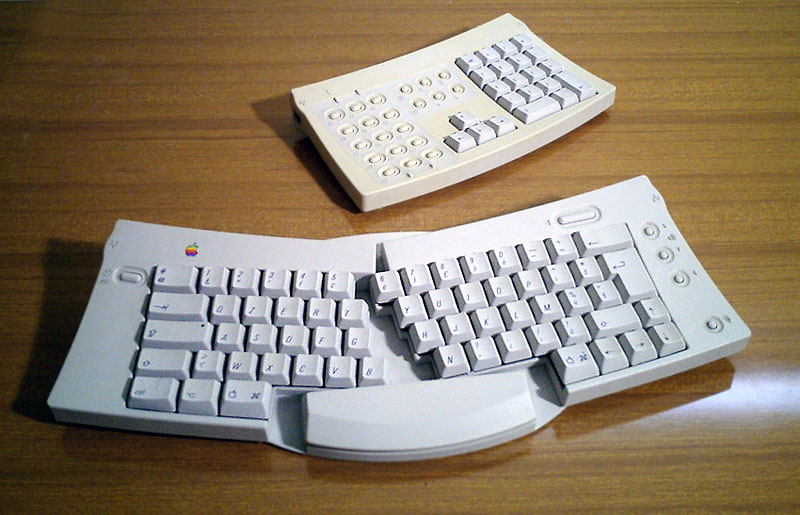
The Apple Adjustable Keyboard (1992) splits the alphanumeric keys into two halves with an adjustable opening angle

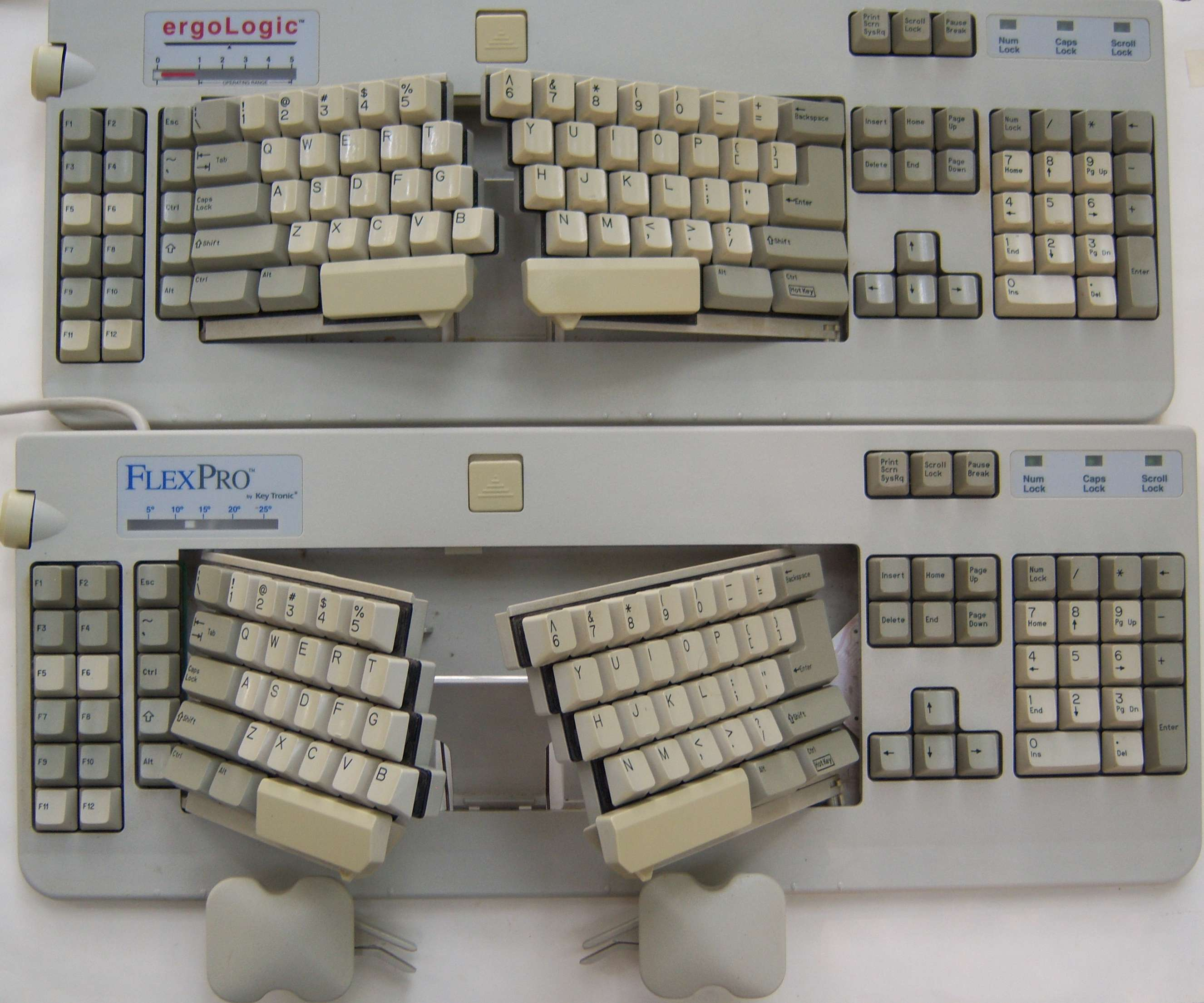
KeyTronic FlexPro and OEM ergoLogic (1993)

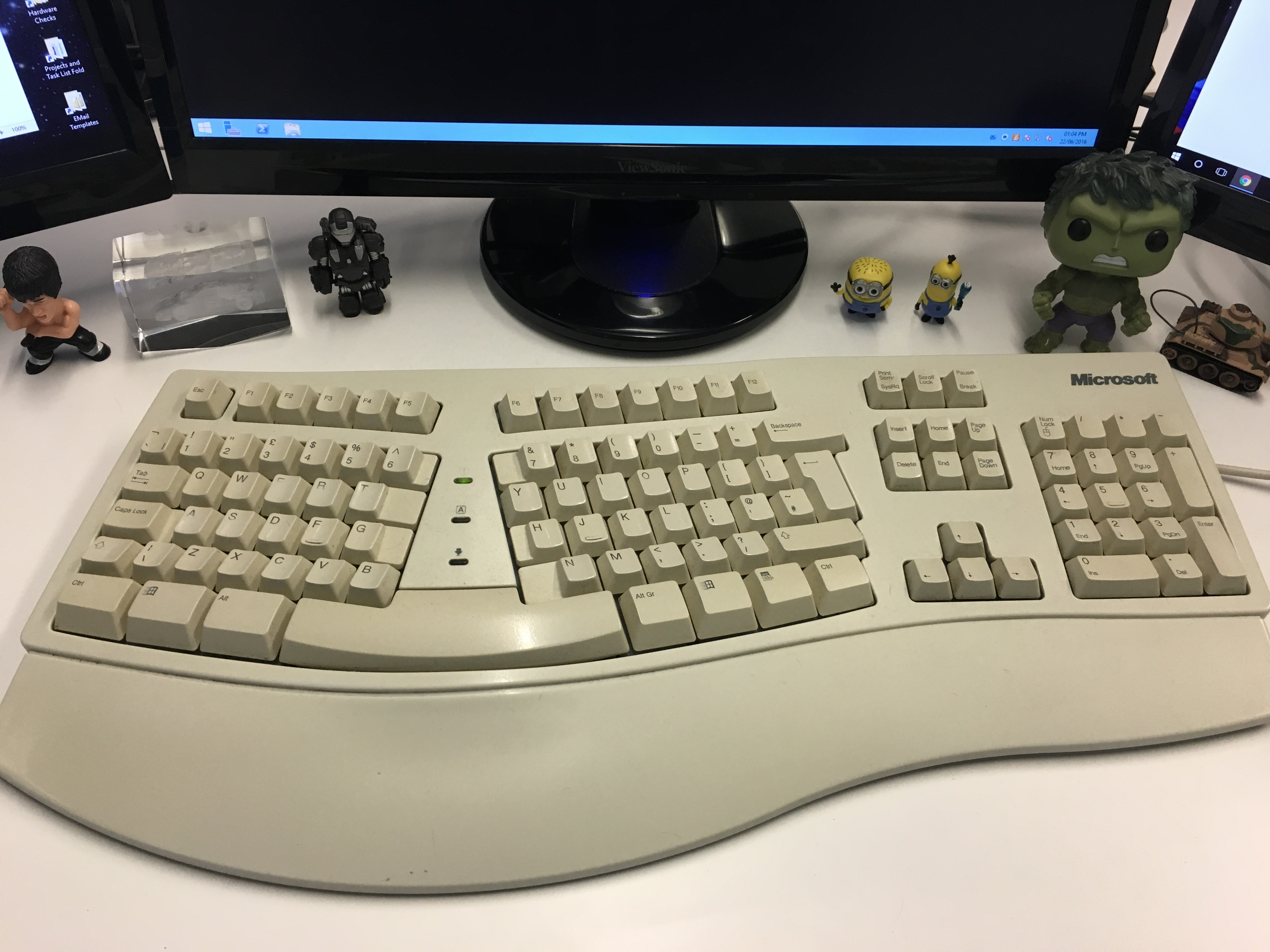
The Microsoft Natural Keyboard (1994) is a fixed split keyboard

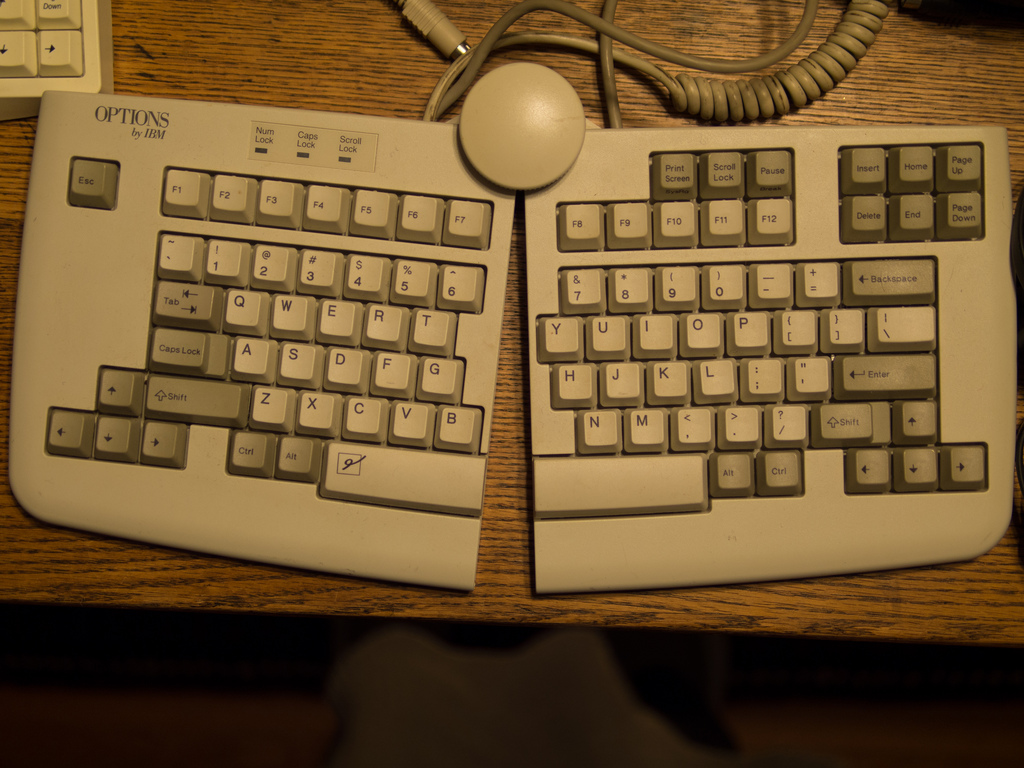
IBM Adjustable Keyboard (Model M15, 1994) with a ball joint to control opening and tenting angles

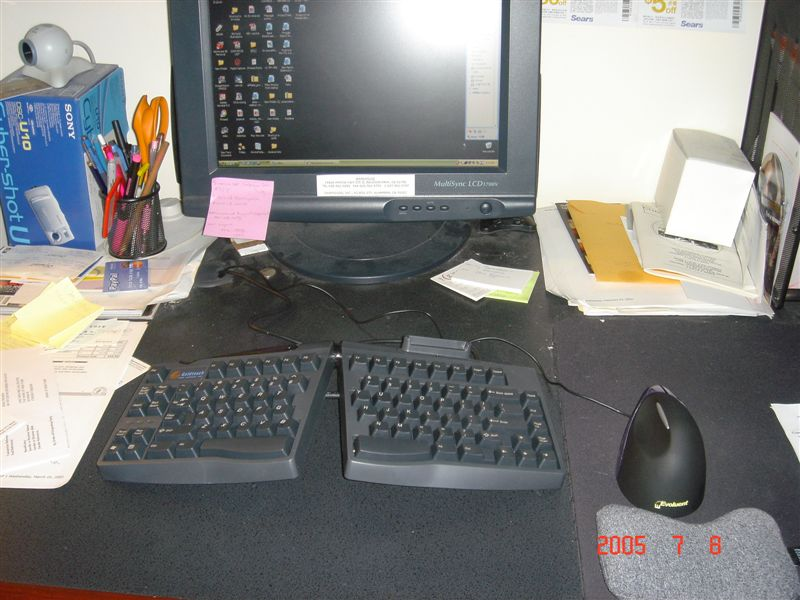
Goldtouch (1997) adjustable split keyboard has a similar ball joint

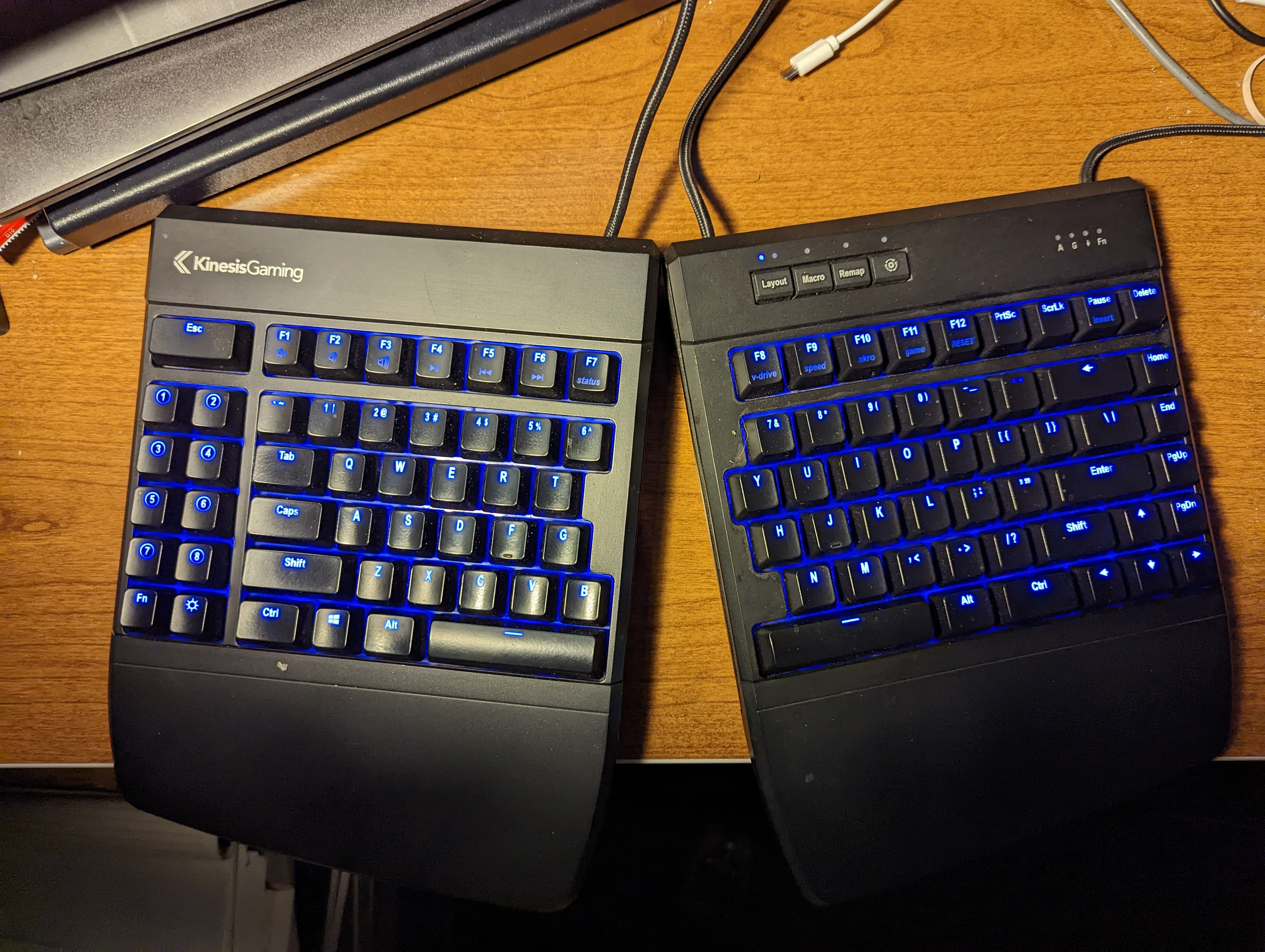
The Kinesis Freestyle (2007) adjustable split keyboard linked by a cable and removable link; additional accessories are used to adjust tenting angle or attach a handrest

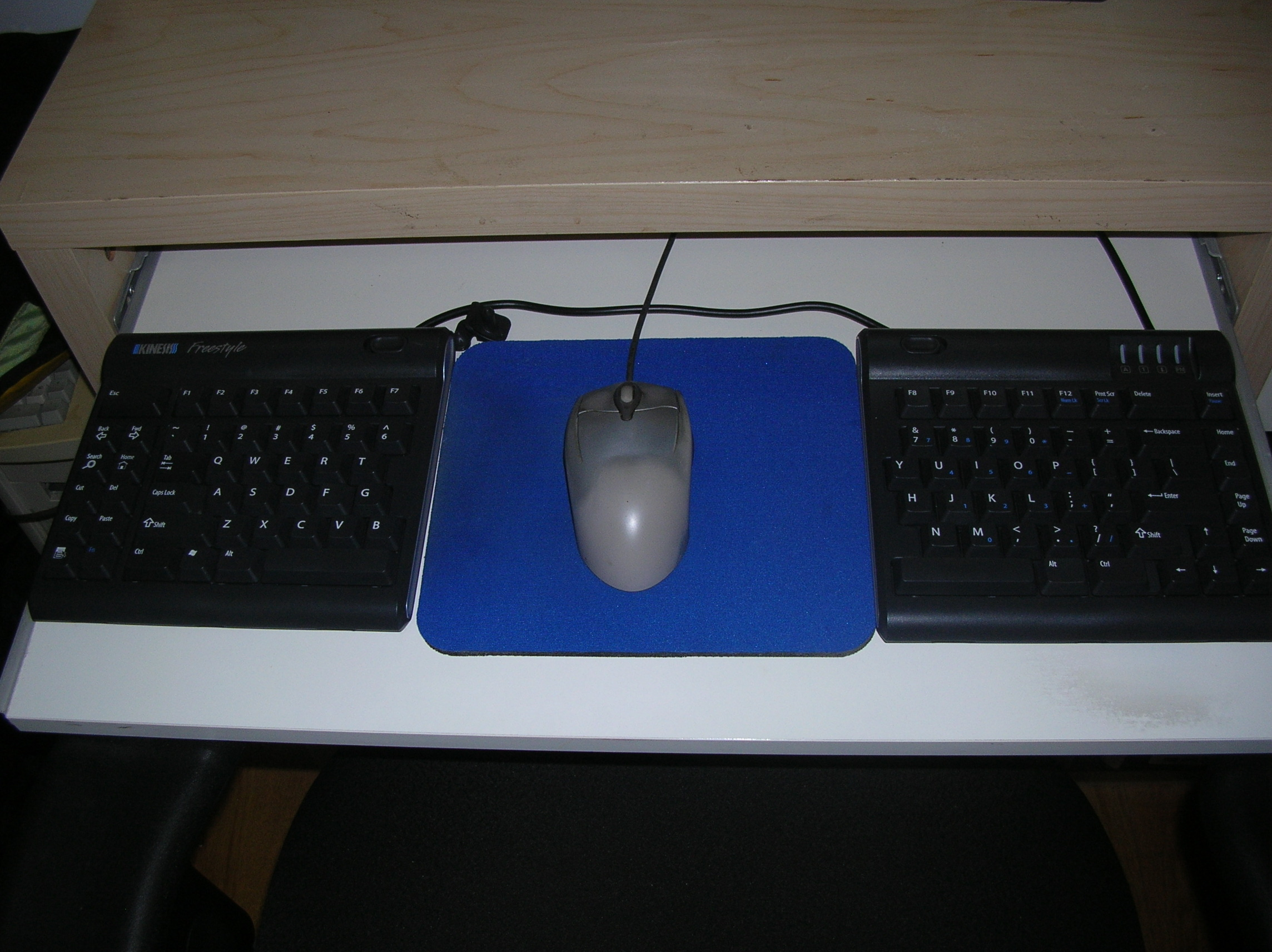
The Kinesis Free style allows fully splitting each key cluster

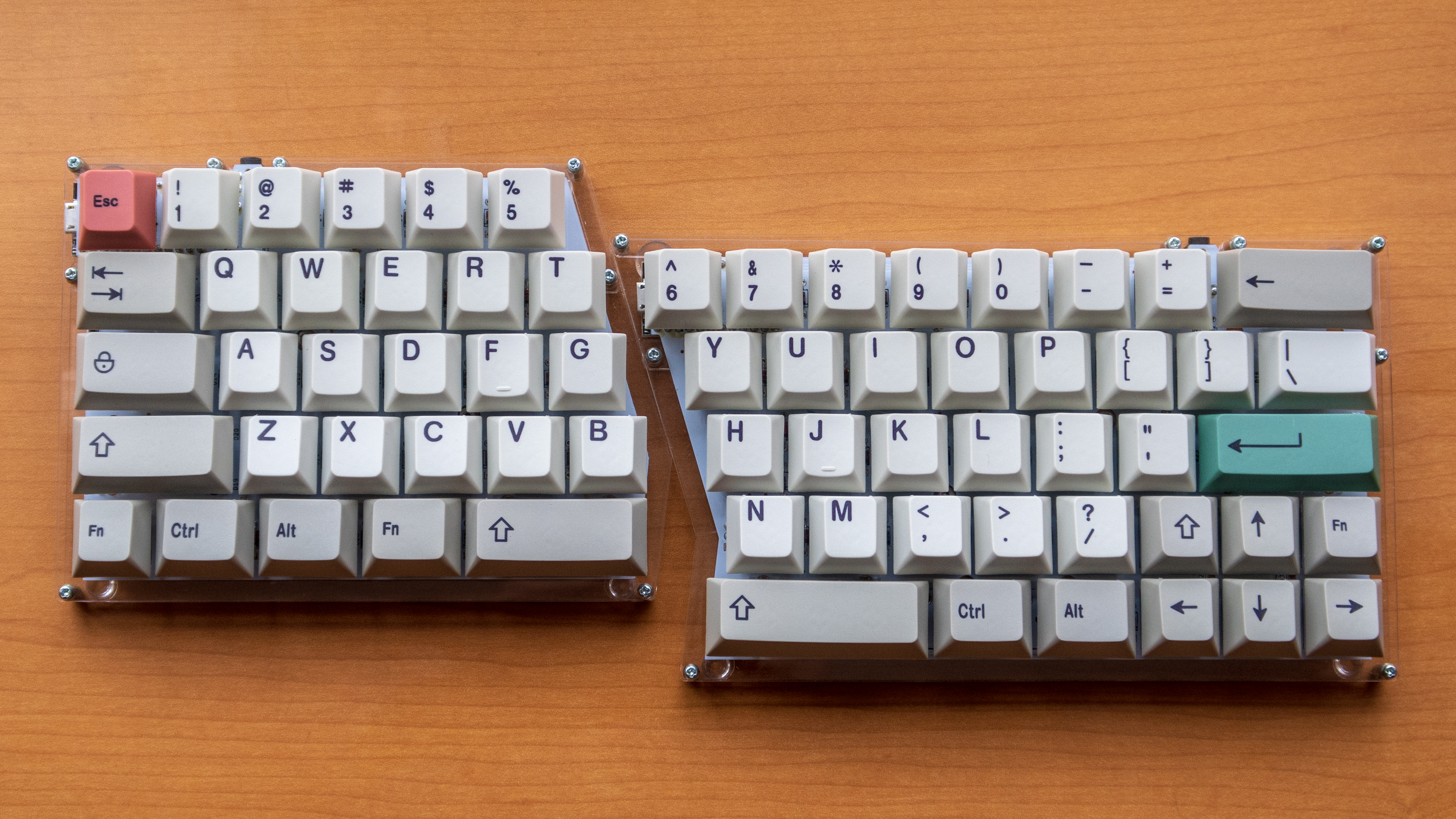
DIY keyboard with full split and compact layout

=== Vertical column layout ===
Because electric typewriters and computer keyboards no longer need to accommodate a mechanical linkage, the keys can be set in vertical columns without staggering, minimizing lateral finger movements when moving between rows, but increases the distance between the pointing finger neutral position to some of its secondary keys. This vertical layout rearranges the keys into linear columns. If the rows remain aligned horizontally, the resulting ortholinear layout puts the keys on an orthogonal grid. Other designs use vertical columns with staggered rows to compensate for the difference in finger lengths. A keyboard with vertical columns can require an adjustment period as the user retrains their finger movements.

Those keyboards combine often vertical or semi-vertical columns with split angle design. There it is easier to position the hand near perpendicular to the key rows. Examples of such types include the Truly Ergonomic keyboard, ErgoDox, ZSA Moonlander, and Zergotech Freedom keyboard.

Variety of vertical column keyboards evolved especially from the DIY community

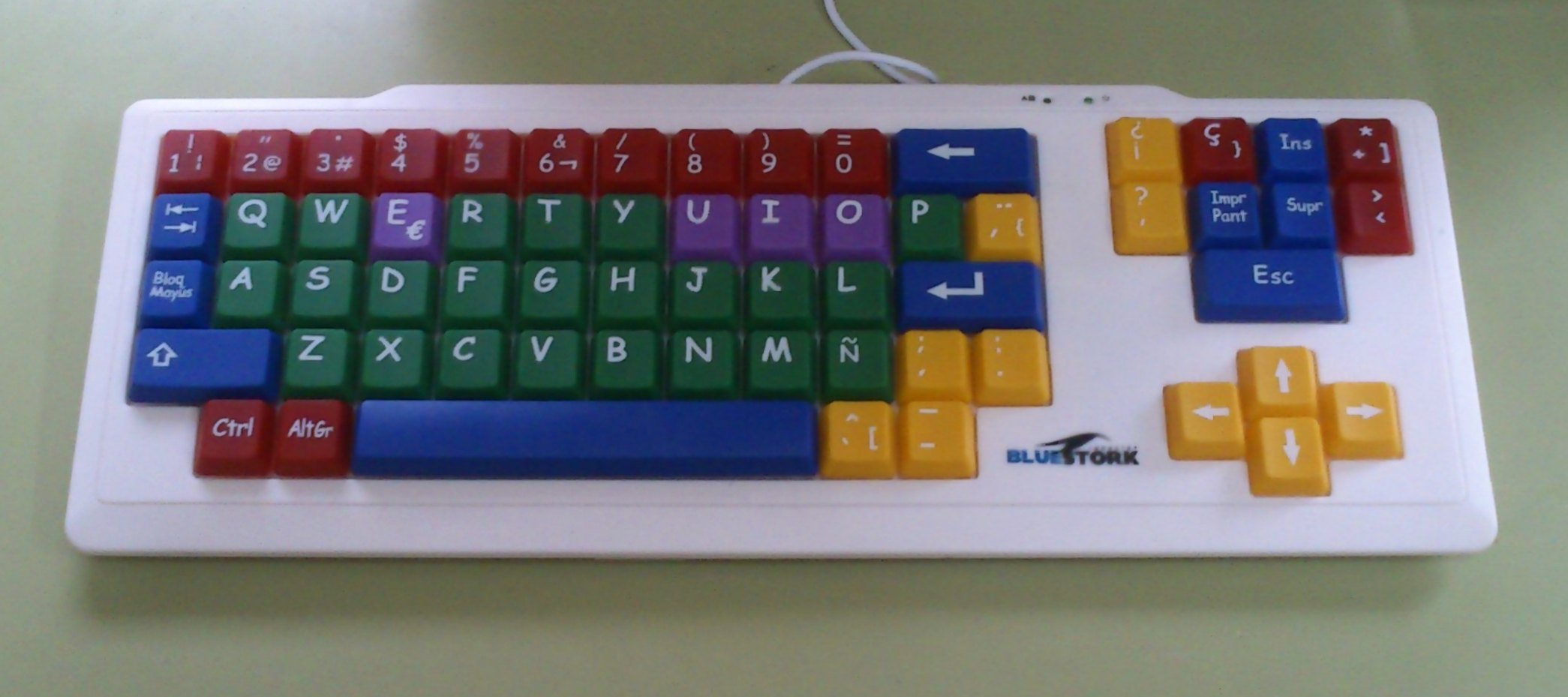
An ortholinear keyboard, with keys arranged in an orthogonal grid with vertical columns

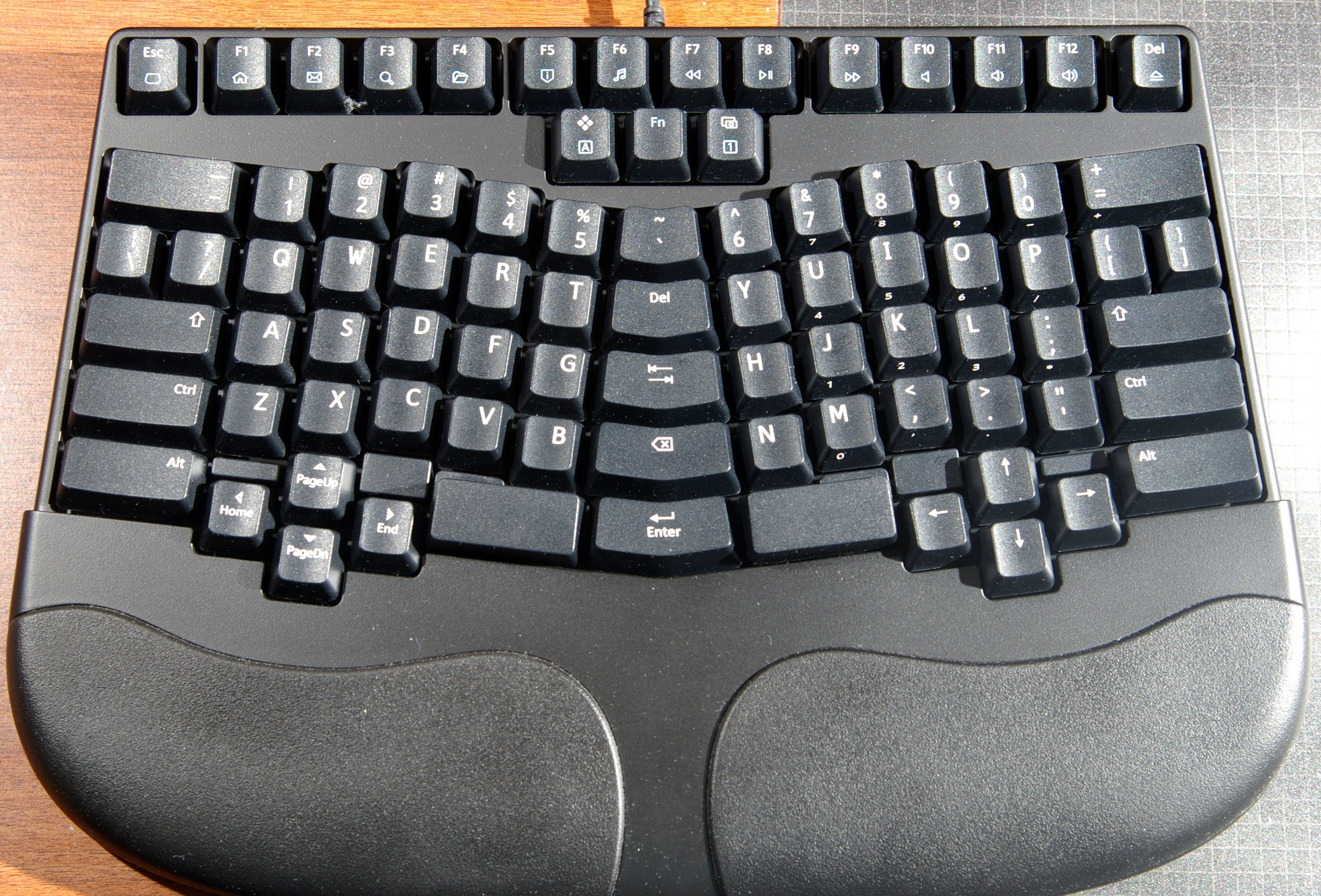
The Truly Ergonomic keyboard, which combines fixed-split design with staggered columns

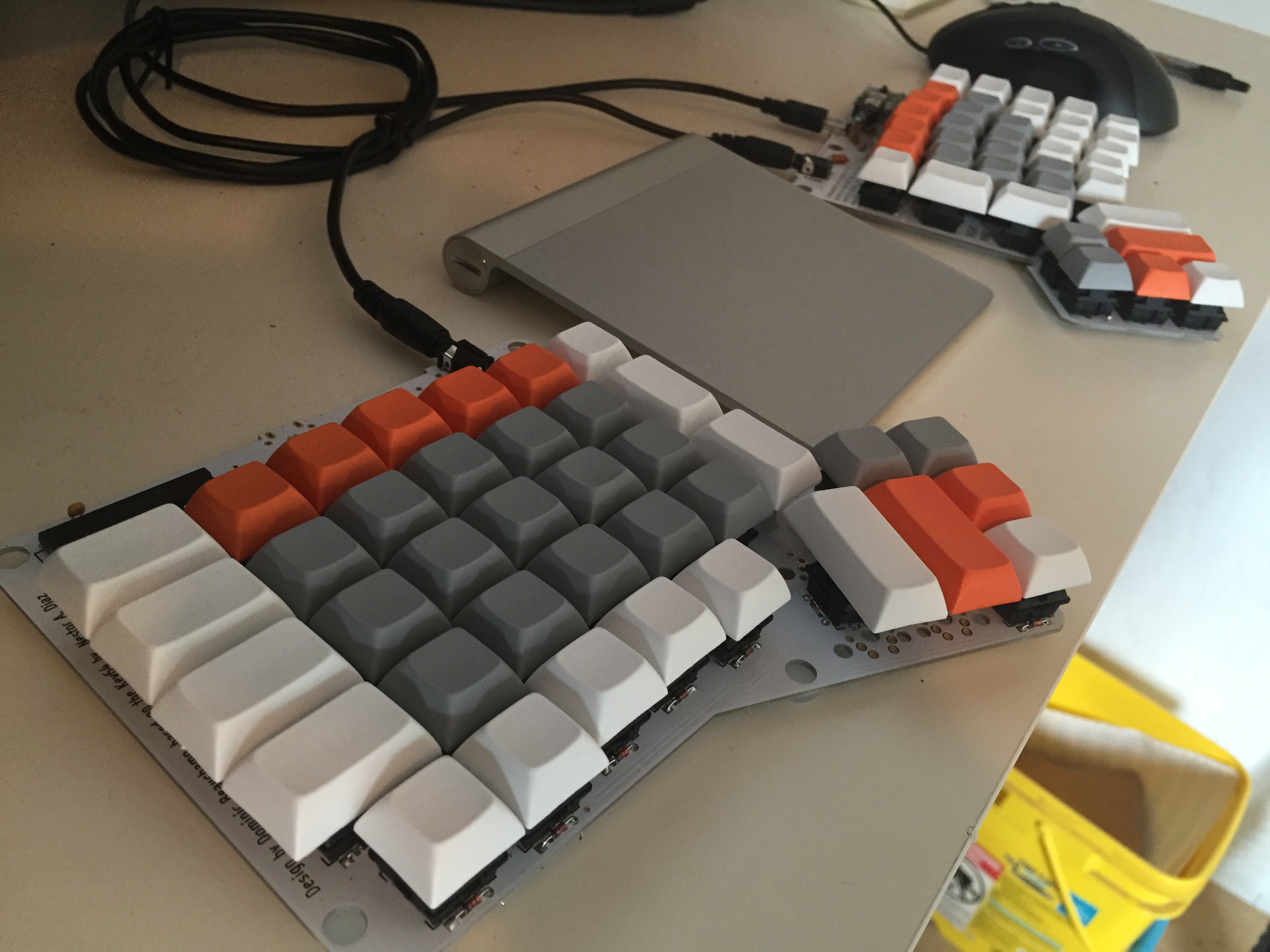
ErgoDox, adjustable-split with staggered columns and thumb blocks

=== Contoured surface ===
The preceding split and vertical column keyboards arranged each key cluster onto a single flat plane. Contoured- or dished-surface keyboards like the Maltron (1977) or the newer Kinesis Advantage line (1992+) are fixed split keyboards with tenting that place the keys into two curved depressions set approximately at shoulder width. The function keys, navigation keys, and modifiers such as ⇧ Shift, PgUp, etc. are set between the key groups for use with the thumbs. For these keyboards, the resulting bowl-like key surfaces are intended to minimize and make consistent the finger extension required to strike keys away from the home row. In general, contoured keyboards also incorporate a vertical column layout with staggered rows for each hand. In this configuration, minimal movement of arms and wrists is required.

Some keyboards combine vertical key columns and contoured surfaces with fully-adjustable (independent) split key clusters. Examples include the Kinesis Advantage 360, Dactyl Manuform, and MoErgo Glove80. With a relatively small market, many are custom-built or sold as kits to be assembled by the user, with extensive customization options.

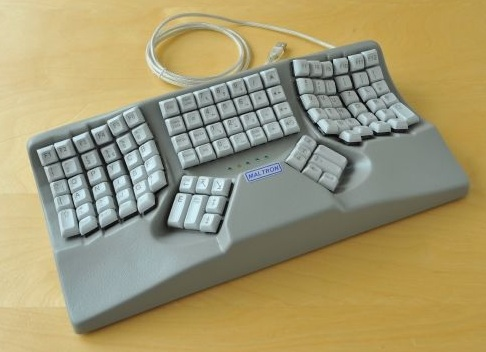
Maltron contoured keyboard with Malt Layout

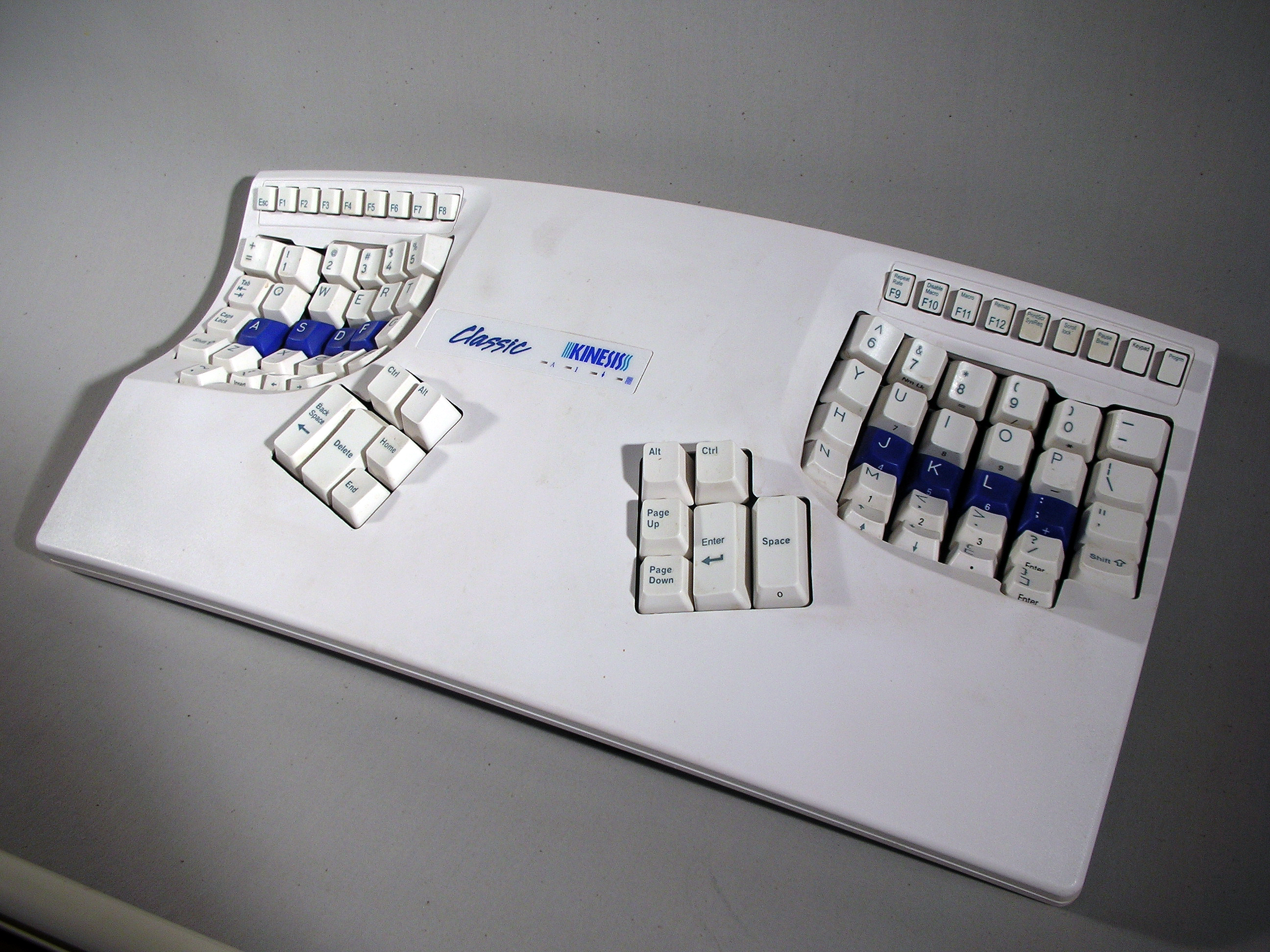
Kinesis Contoured Classic with QWERTY layout

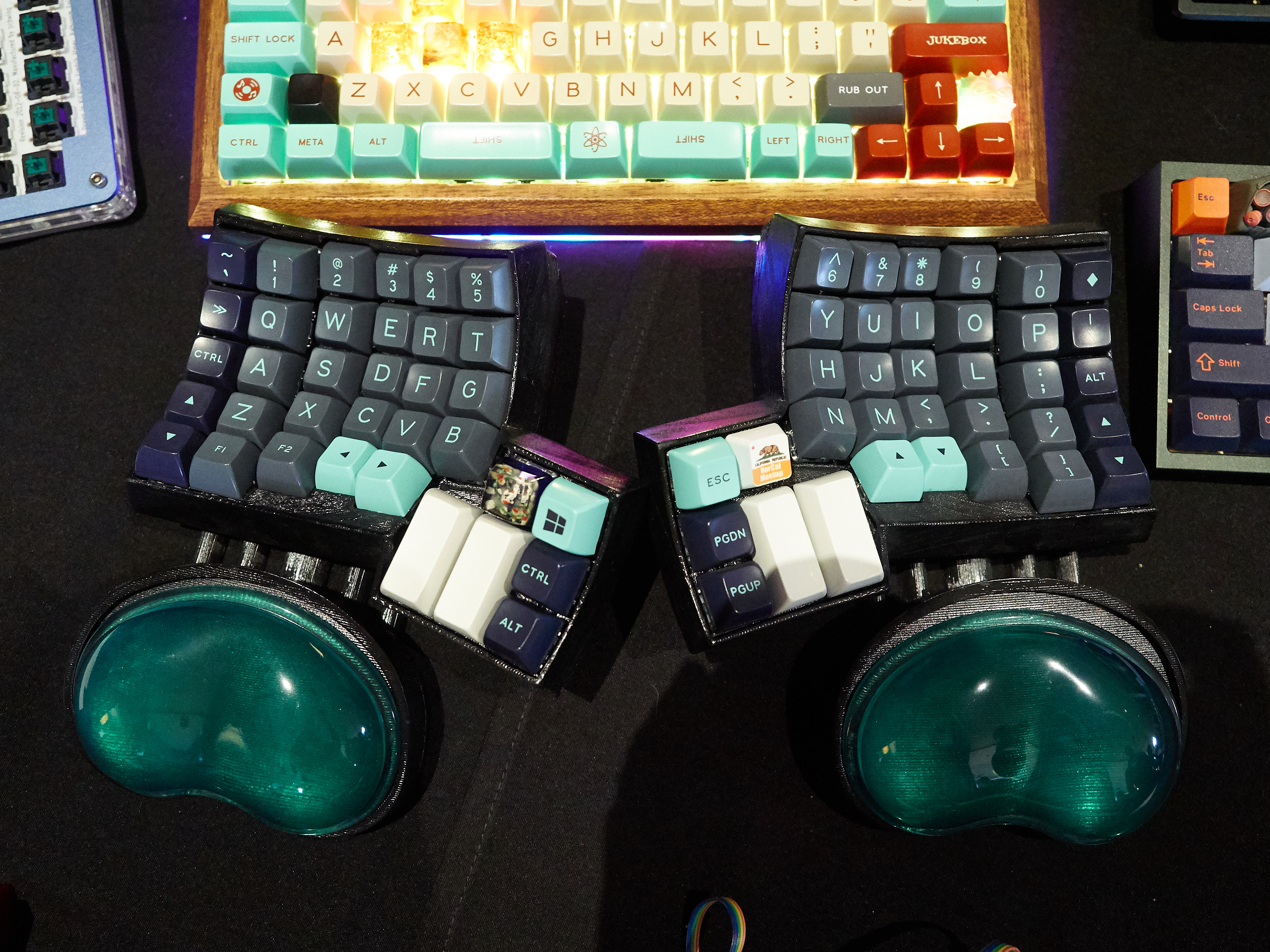
Custom adjustable split contoured keyboard with vertical columns and staggered rows

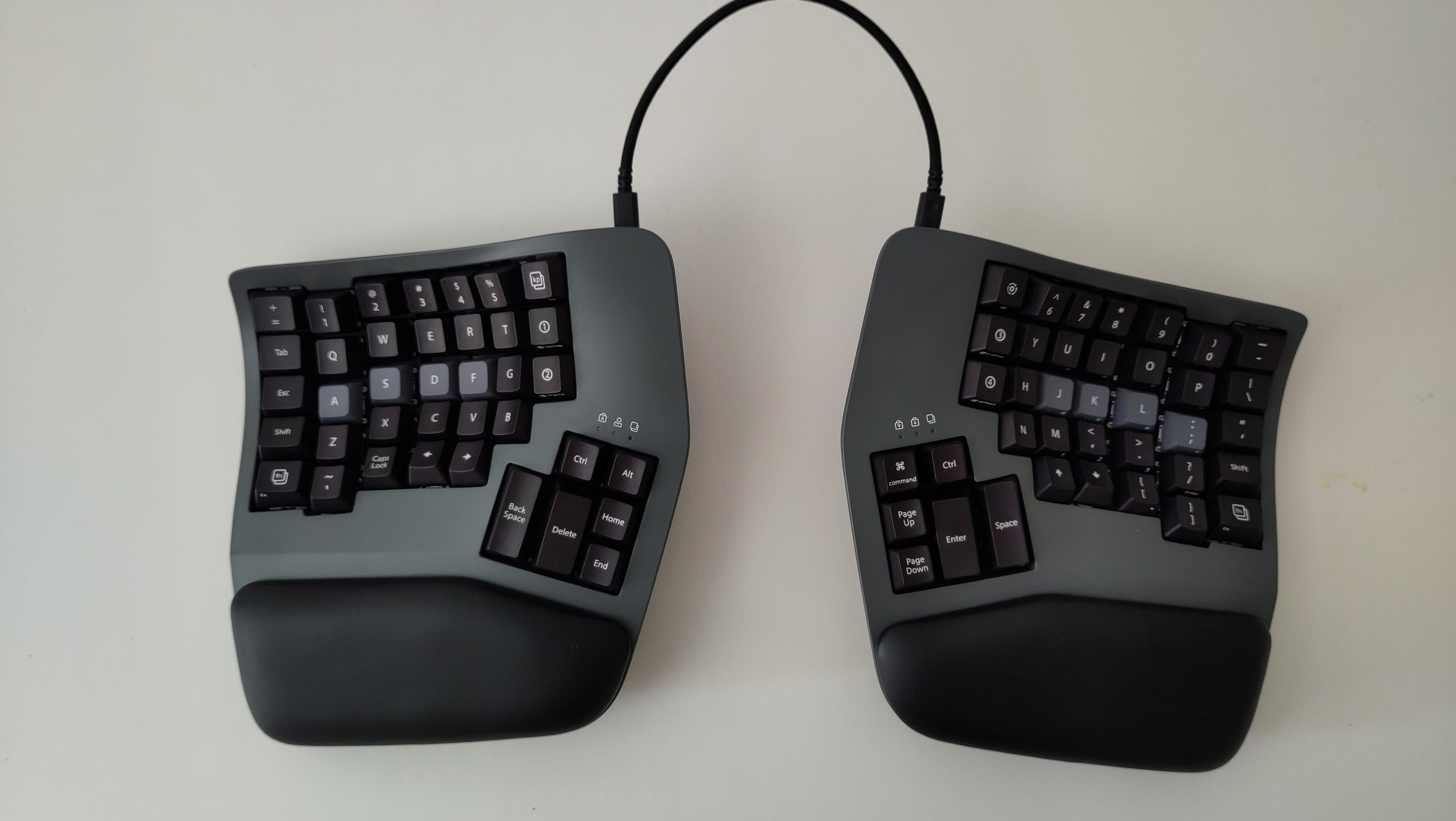
The Kinesis Advantage 360 combines contoured keyboards with fully split characteristics

=== Vertical keyboard ===
Notably the SafeType keyboard might be a special case of split layout with the 90° tenting angle.

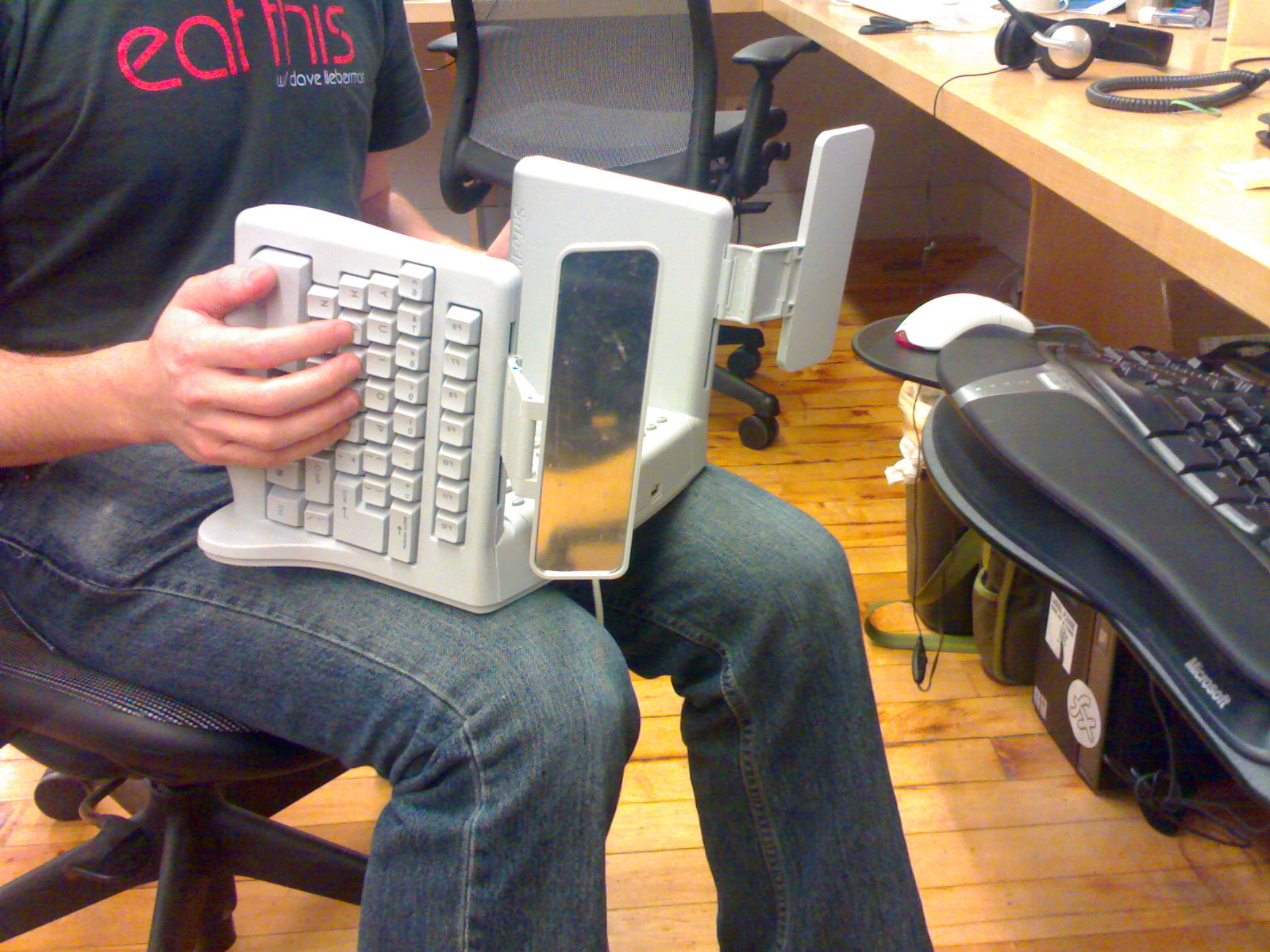
The SafeType keyboard is a fixed split keyboard with a 90° tenting angle

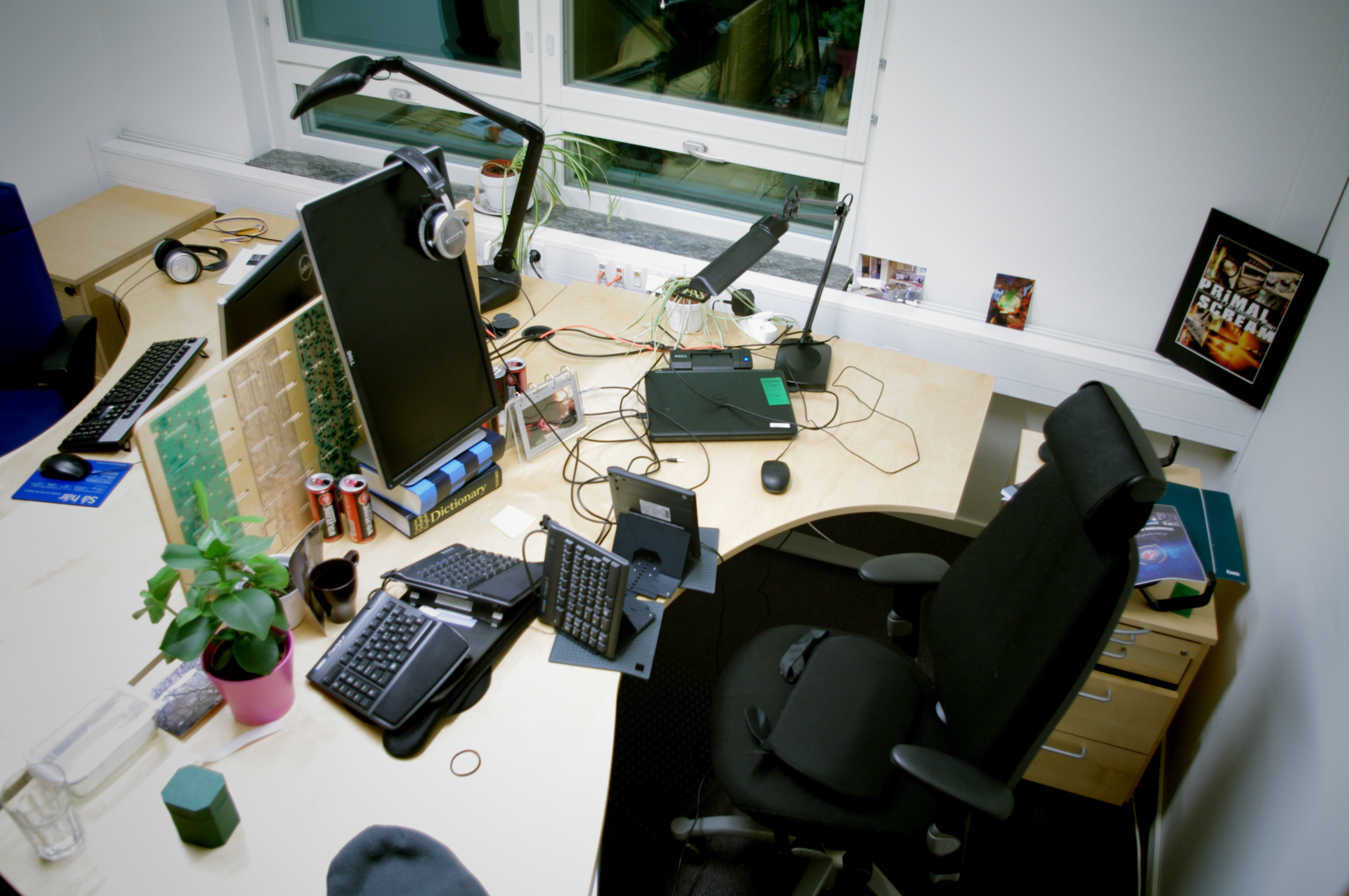
Kinesis Freestyle with vertical Ascent clipped

=== Keyswitches ===
Some ergonomic keyboards are offered with switches with reduced actuation force, with the goal of reducing strain on fingers from repeated keypresses.

=== Programmable firmware ===
Programmable firmware, such as QMK, allows the behavior of a keyboard to be modified. This has several ergonomic benefits for ergonomic keyboards:

- A layout other than QWERTY, for example Dvorak, may be chosen with the goal of reducing finger movement.
- The keyboard may be programmed to support several 'layers', allowing the functionality of the keyboard to be moved to a smaller and easier-to-reach set of keys.
- Home row keys may be configured to act as modifier keys when held down, removing the need for separate modifier keys and reducing the strain necessary for inputting keyboard shortcuts.

== Keyboard alternatives ==
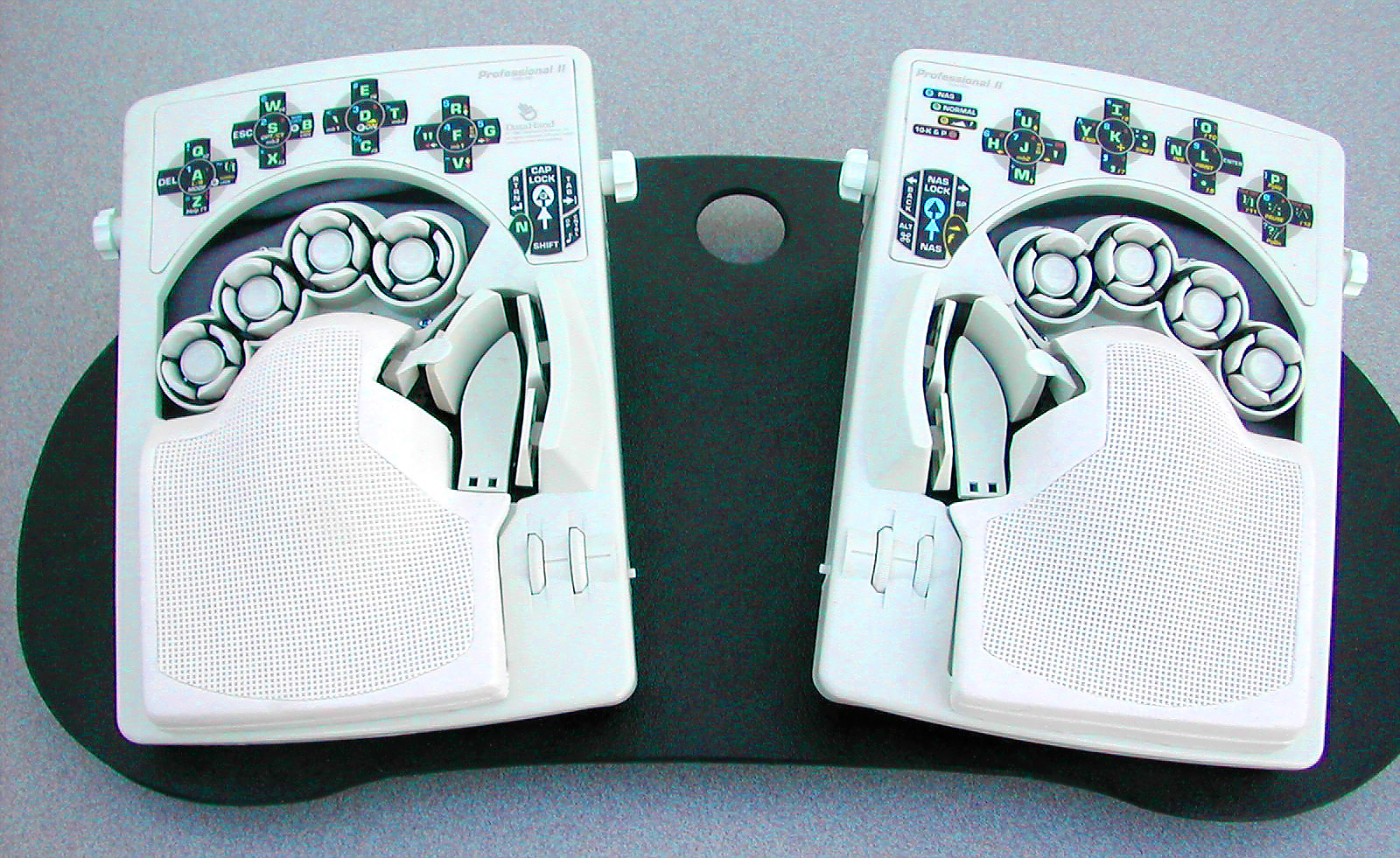
DataHand left and right entry devices

A few ergonomic keyboards do not have the typical one key per letter, such as a keyer, chorded or a keyless ergonomic keyboard. For example, DataHand eliminates the need for any wrist motion or finger extension; each finger has five separate switches triggered by buttons or paddles.

Advances in speech recognition have made it possible to eliminate the use of a keyboard altogether, particularly on smaller devices that lack traditional keyboard interfaces.

Handheld ergonomic keyboards are designed to be held like a game controller, and can be used as such, instead of laid out flat on top of a table surface. They allow the user the ability to move around a room or to lean back on a chair while also being able to type in front or away from the computer. Some variations of handheld ergonomic keyboards also include a trackball mouse that allow mouse movement and typing included in one handheld device.

Various alternatives

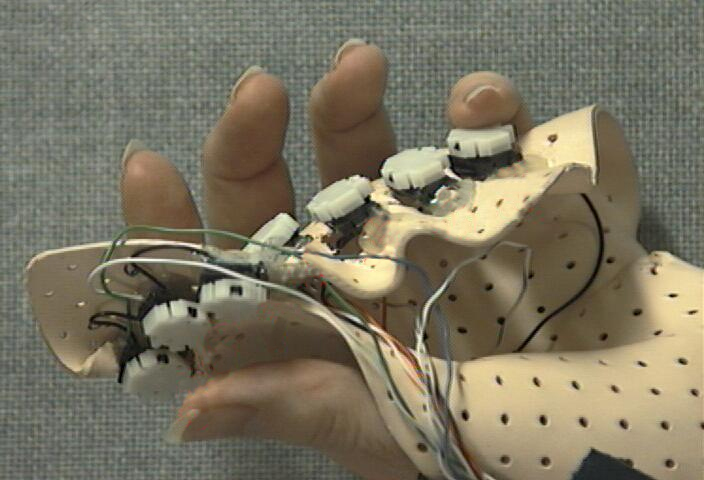
Handmade keyer with seven key switches, custom-molded for the left hand of a single user

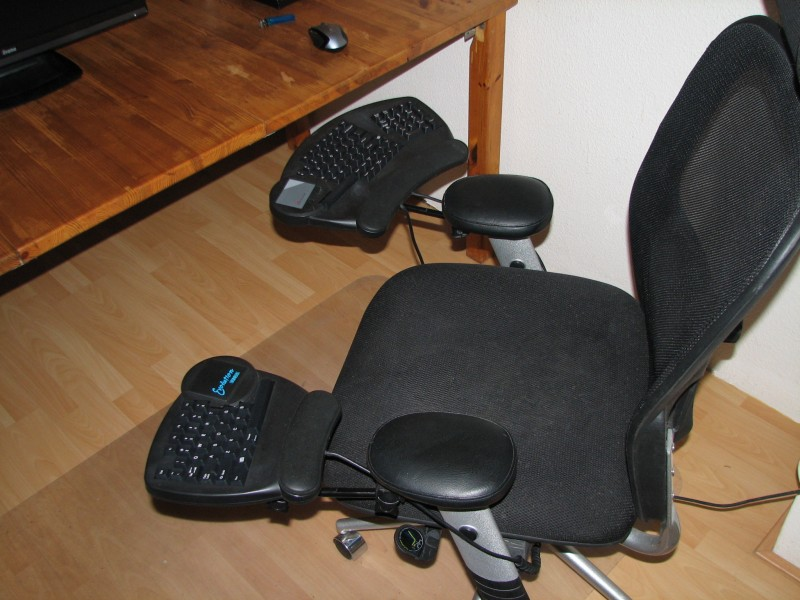
Chair integrated keyboard

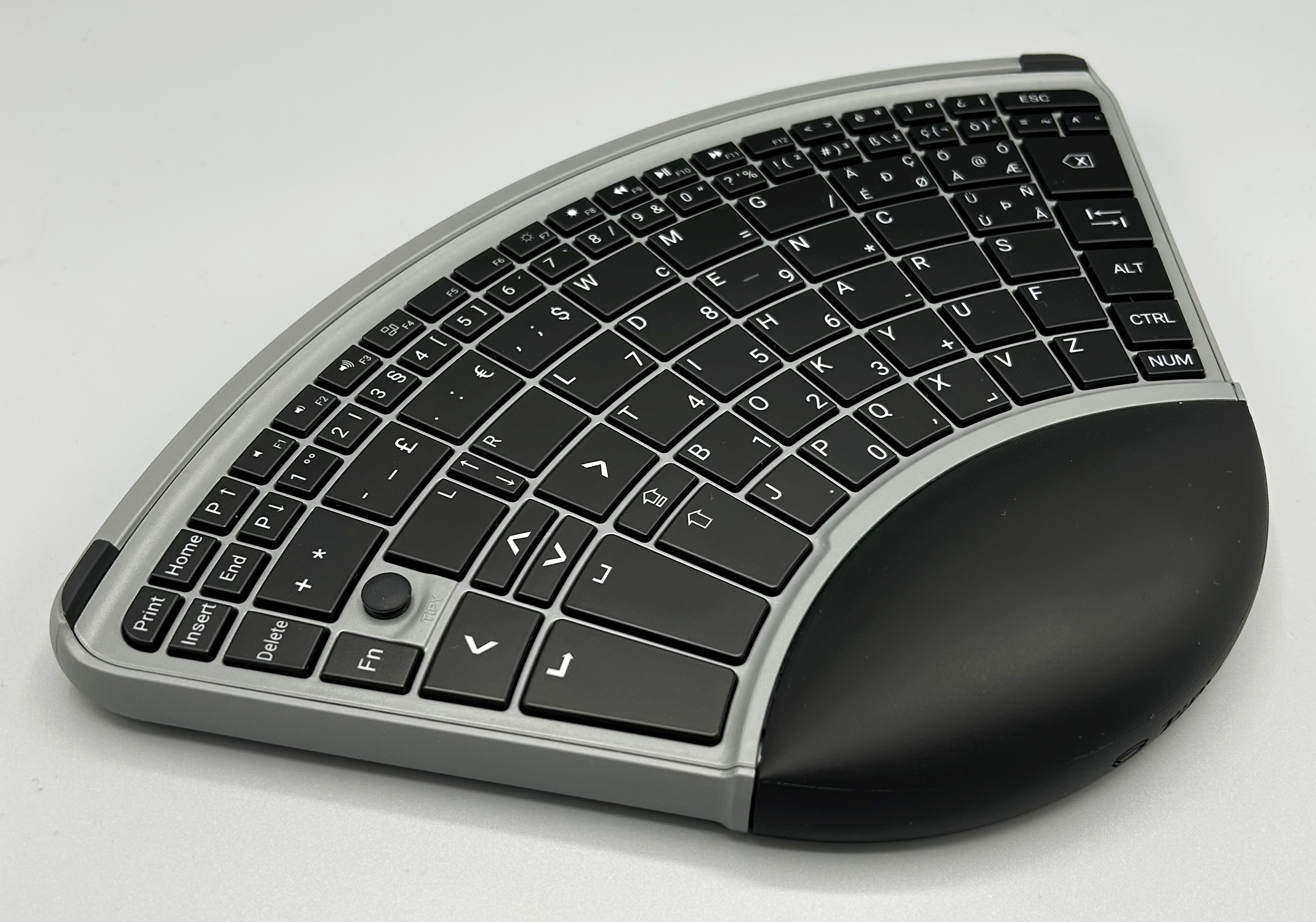
One hand keyboard

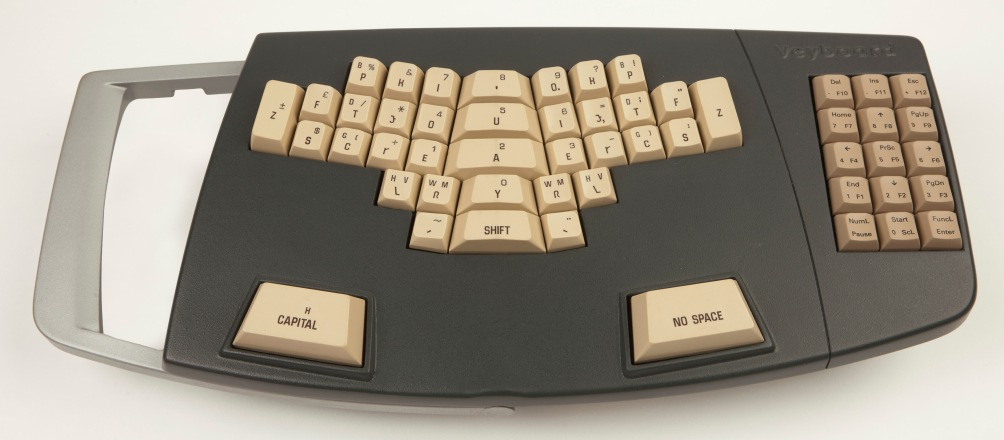
Veyboard (Velotype)

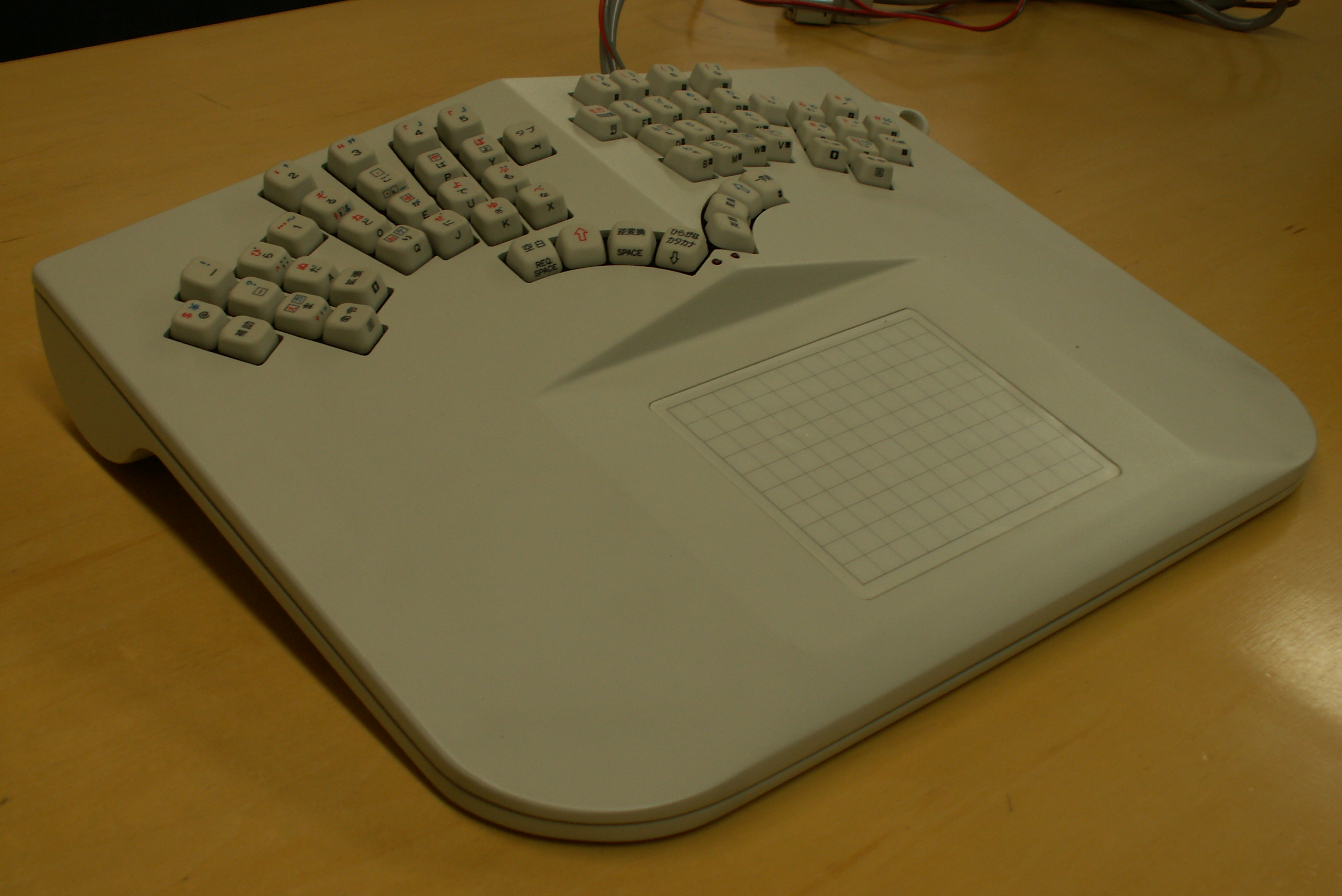
Specialized Japanese Keyboard as part of the TRON project

== Considerations ==
It is widely claimed that an ergonomic keyboard may reduce muscle strain and reduce risk of carpal tunnel syndrome or other kinds of repetitive strain injury. There are many factors leading to such conditions that appear only after extended use, making it challenging to isolate a single cause. An ergonomic keyboard alone doesn't make an ergonomic workplace. It requires the involvement of the user, the whole environment and the tasks being executed. But such keyboards fulfill general principles of ergonomics that advocate for comfortable posture with joints in neutral position to reduce general strain. There are indications, however, that these are not well tolerated. They break with existing user habits, differ from other workplaces and usually consume more desk space. For better user acceptance layout changes should be avoided, tenting and hand-rests should be optional and user preferences must be respected.

Narrow studies examining hand position at rest neglect many other possible factors. Ergonomic keyboards may only change the area of stress instead of eliminating it.

== See also ==
- List of repetitive strain injury software
- Keyboard layout
- Samsung Sens 810, the first laptop with an ergonomic keyboard
- Maltron
