= Maltron =

Ergonomic keyboard manufacturer

PCD Maltron Ltd
- Industry: Personal computer hardware
- Founder: Lillian Malt
- Products: Ergonomic keyboards
- Website: www.maltron.com

PCD Maltron Ltd, trading as Maltron, is a manufacturer of ergonomic special-needs keyboards. It was founded by South African-born inventor Lillian Malt and manufacturer Stephen Hobday. Maltron specialises in making keyboards for the prevention and etiological (root cause) treatment of repetitive strain injury.

Maltron manufactures several models of keyboard, in varying levels of adaptation. Malt's original invention and the company's flagship design, the Fully Ergonomic 3D Keyboard, is the most highly adapted; it incorporates a curved surface in which the keys' angles and depths are staggered to compensate for the different lengths and placement of the fingers. Customers can choose an integral trackball at extra cost. Other types include single-hand keyboards, a flat version of the fully ergonomic keyboard, a keyboard designed to be used by a single digit or headstick or mouthstick, and a robust expanded keyboard for people with cerebral palsy. Maltron keyboards are electrically compatible with IBM PC keyboards and Apple Keyboards, using USB connectors. Earlier models used mini-DIN or PS/2 connectors but these are now discontinued.

== History ==
Lillian Malt ran a secretarial training business from 1955. Based upon her experience of typing errors (having been closely concerned in the printing industry with retraining Linotype operators to use computer keyboards), she had the idea for a typewriter keyboard with the keys arranged to fit different finger lengths but found no manufacturer willing to work with her. In 1974, Stephen Hobday came to her with a one-handed keyboard that he had designed for the handicapped. Malt made several suggestions for improvement, telling Hobday of her failure to engage the interest of any manufacturers in actually building her ideal keyboard. Hobday told her "You tell me what you want and I'll tell you whether I can build it or not." The first Maltron keyboard was the result of their collaboration.

The full name of the company, PCD Maltron Ltd, stems from Hobday's original electronics firm, Printed Circuit Design Limited, based in Farnborough, Hampshire. The seeds of PCD Maltron were sown when another Hampshire business had inquired about the possibility of custom manufacture of a computer keyboard. This led to discussions with Farnborough Technical College about the design of the keyboard and in turn to the meeting with Malt.

Stanley notes that Malt was almost erased from history in the 1970s, with only one of two 1979 articles in The Inventor (the journal of the British Institute of Patentees and Inventors) even mentioning her, crediting only Hobday. However, Malt did present a paper describing her work: Malt, Lillian G., 'Keyboard design in the electronic era', Printing Industry Research Association, Symposium Paper No. 6, September 1977.

== Models ==
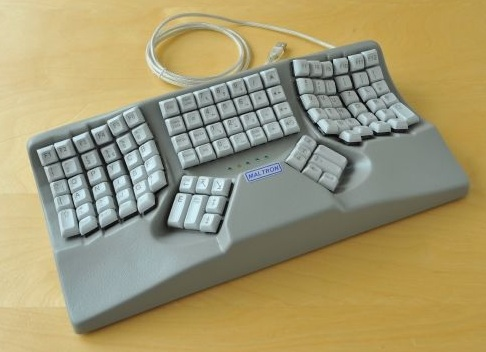
Maltron Dual Hand with Malt Key distribution

There are five models of Maltron keyboard. Two target general users, of which one is the original curved, retro-styled keyboard. The other three are geared towards people with more pervasive disabilities. Although the general form has remained the same, the original keyboard has gone through several revisions.

Maltron keyboards became well known in the 1980s and 1990s for their distinctive layouts. Hackaday described the Maltron keyboard as "a mass of injection-moulded plastic with two deep dishes for all the keys." Tom's Hardware said that the keyboards were "one of the real first ergonomic, split keyboard to use keywells. Designed for people suffering from RSI, its makers sought to address the needs of people who were, or at the risk of, being harmed by extensive typing."

Customers requested a halfway house between a conventional QWERTY keyboard and the curved Maltron, so a flat (2D) version was introduced which although lacking the curvature of the 3D keyboard, incorporates split key groups, and offset letter rows to accommodate the different lengths of the fingers.

For severely disabled users, there are the single-handed, headstick, mouthstick and expanded models.

All Maltron keyboards use Cherry MX brand key-switches, which are much more responsive and durable than the membrane or dome key-switches used on most keyboards.

== Layouts ==
US Maltron L89 3D Keyboard-Layout

Maltron 3D and 2D (flat) keyboards are produced with three different layouts: QWERTY, Dvorak and Maltron.

In 2009, PC World magazine named the devices among the "world's weirdest keyboards", particularly the right-handed single-hand model that sold for US$413 at the time.

In the Maltron layout, the home row of keys are "ANISF" for the left hand and "DTHOR" for the right. This can be used to type many more complete words than that found on a QWERTY keyboard.

The Maltron layout was derived from frequency of use (FoU) statistics, plus additional considerations, such as the most frequent two- and three-letter combinations found in words. As much as possible, such combinations need to be placed as non-blocking sequences.

Whilst the letter E is the most common letter in English, the space character is nearly twice as common; the comma and full stop are more frequent than the letters KVJZXQ.

Directional or cursor keys have also been subject to changes in design. Whilst the earlier PC-XT compatible Model B featured opposing keys near each other such as PgUp and PgDn aligned vertically on the left little finger, and arrow keys arranged UP/DN and LF/RT on either thumb, later models were to introduce a complete design philosophy where such keys were split into left-right locations matching the former re-arrangement of such characters as "(" and ")" which had been moved to sit above the numbers 5 & 6 (as "< >","[ ]", "{ }" and "/ \" had been similarly separated). This meant that any movement to the left or up (Backspace, PgUp, Left etc.) was keyed with the left hand, and any that moved right or down were keyed with the right hand.

Further variation in design has been a slight rotation of the key bowl upward in the centre which reduces the amount of pronation in operators' wrists. Referring back specifically to the Model-B, the key bowl required the hands, although separated from each other, still to be rotated outward as though operating a flat keyboard.

Another change moved the twelve function keys to a new top row inside the bowl rather than as a straight line along the back, which the single-handed versions retain. The standard numeric row (1 through 0) has also been shifted one column to the left aligning "1" with "F1", "2" with "F2" and so on. The blank area between the two thumb keys has also been raised to prevent the "dropped-wrist" operation of the number pad, although because of its location and layout, the keyboard must be moved laterally when entering continuous numeric data, to accommodate the dominant hand (left or right). This increases the amount of desk space the keyboard needs.

There is only one key below the home row for the ring finger (made obvious by the gap in the next row). As the middle and ring fingers share the same tendon along the back of the hand, removing excess "under-reach" for the ring finger alleviates potential stress on this tendon thus contributing to the keyboard's overall success in reducing repetitive strain injuries.

== Manufacture ==
The keyboards have been made by hand since the 1970s. They have vacuum-formed cases and each switch is hand-wired. The keyboards have a thumb cluster area where thumbs can hit keys other than the space bar.

== See also ==
- Ergonomic keyboard
- List of repetitive strain injury software
- Microsoft ergonomic keyboards
- Repetitive strain injury
