= DataHand =

Computer keyboard

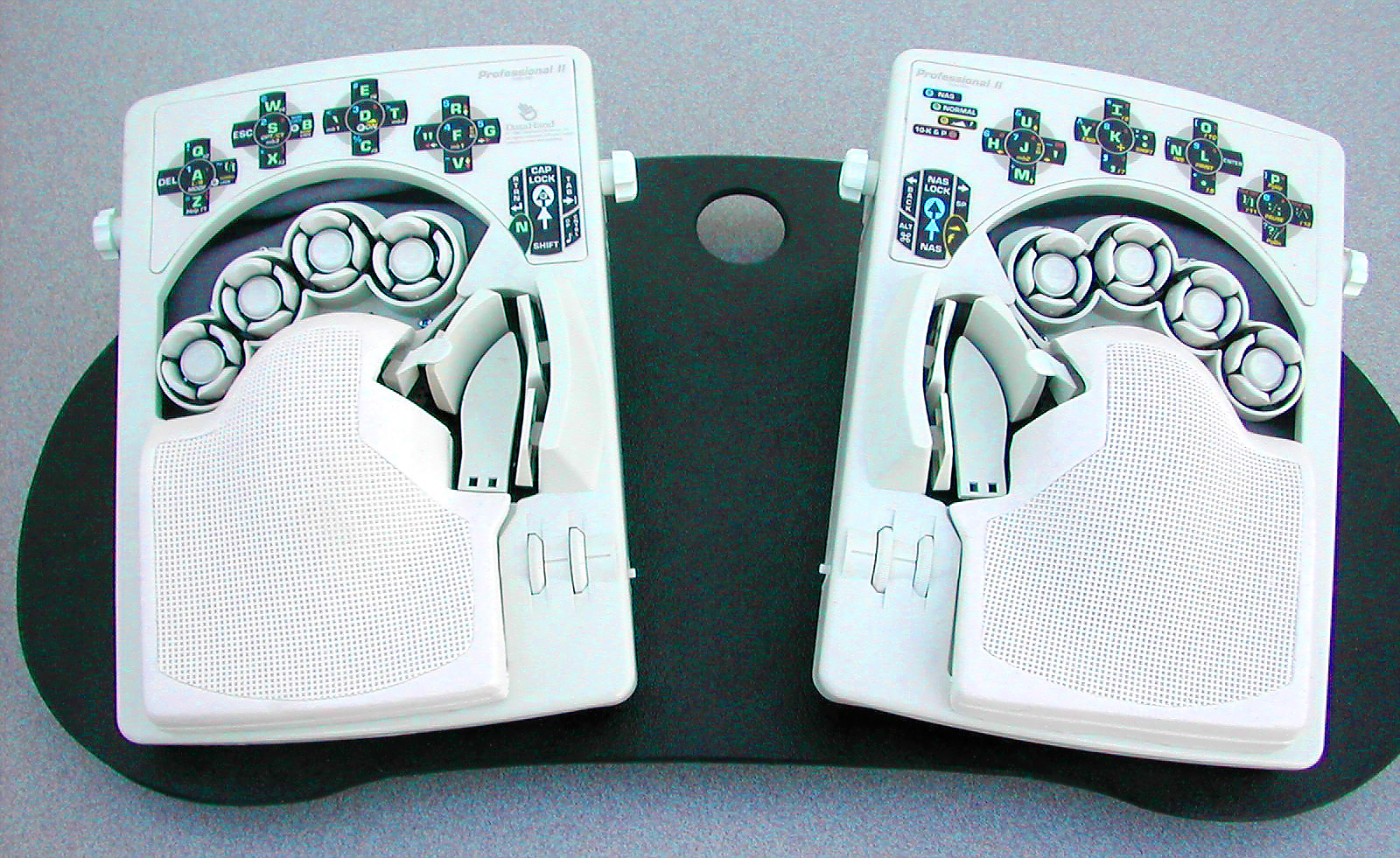
Overhead view of DataHand units that provide full computer keyboard and mouse functionality

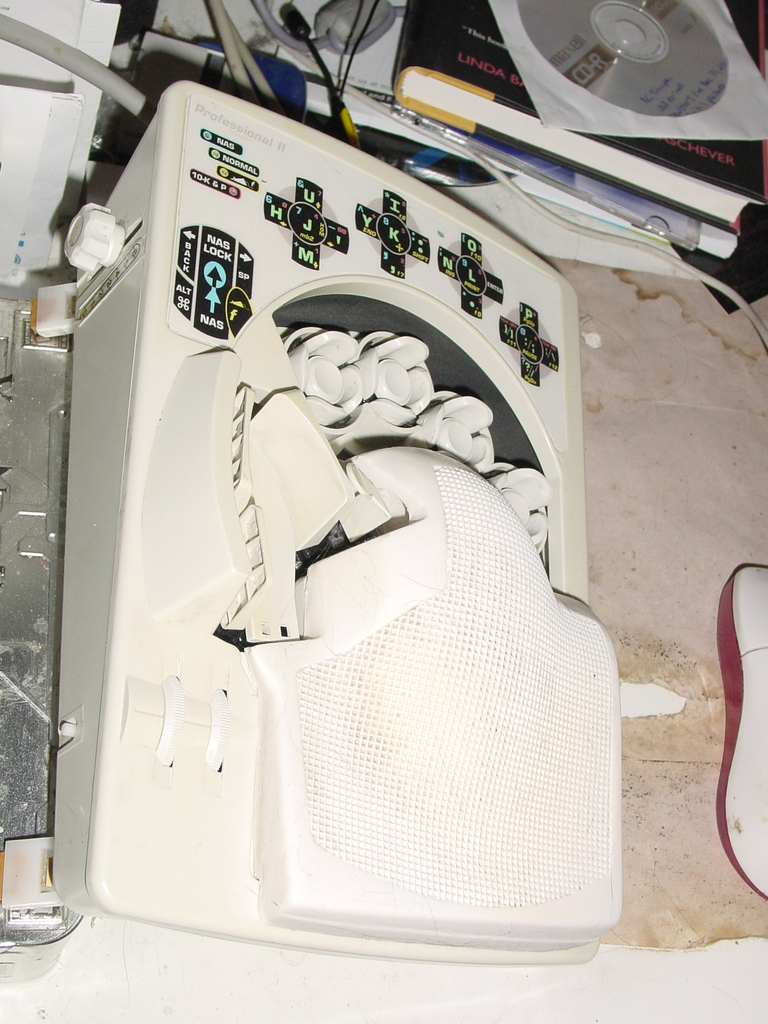
The right-hand of a Professional II keyboard

The DataHand is an unconventional computer keyboard introduced in 1990 by DataHand Systems, Inc., designed to be operated without any wrist motion or finger extension.

== History ==
DataHand Systems, Inc. was founded in 1985. It was invented by Dale J. Retter and produced as early as 1990.

After the initial prototype was released in 1995, DataHand released the Professional and Professional II models with new bodies. The Professional II also has extended programming capabilities over the Professional, being able to record macros of keystrokes for convenient use.

DataHand Systems, Inc. announced in early 2008 that it was ceasing to sell its keyboards. The company web site states that due to supplier issues, the company will not sell the DataHand keyboard "until a new manufacturer can be identified". In January 2009, the company's website started taking orders for a "limited number of new DataHand Pro II units". Circa 19 April 2010, DataHand were out of stock.

== Revival ==
In 2019, a longtime DataHand user going by the pseudonym JesusFreke released an open source DataHand-style device called the lalboard, with plastic parts manufacturable on a home 3D printer, hand-solderable circuit boards, and off-the-shelf magnets. The mechanism is essentially the same as the DataHand, using magnets for key return and optointerrupters to sense the movements of the keys.

In 2023, another longtime DataHand user released a small-run production device called Svalboard, evolving the lalboard design into a manufacturable product.

In 2024, Svalboard launched the Lightly DataHand-style keyboard, which includes trackpoint and trackball pointing device options, as well as a self-print kit for builders who want to make their own.

== Layout ==
It consists of two separate "keyboards", one for the left hand and one for the right. Each finger activates five buttons: the four compass directions as well as down. The thumbs also have five buttons: one inside, two outside, up and down.

The layout is initially similar to a QWERTY keyboard, but the middle two columns of keys (i.e. H, Y, G...) have been delegated to sideways finger movements, and all of the keys outside of the main three rows are accessed through two additional modes, including a mode for mousing. There are three primary modes all together: letters, number and symbols, and function / mouse mode. Some practice is required. However, eventual typing speedups are possible.

Rather than being spring-loaded, the buttons are held in place with magnets and are activated using optical sensors. This was done in order to reduce the finger workload while still giving tactile feedback. The button modules in which the fingers rest are adjustable—each side can be independently moved vertically or forward and back.".

== In popular culture ==
- The keyboard was seen in the 1997 sci-fi movie Contact as the controls for a spaceship.
- It appears in the 2006 spy movie Stormbreaker.
- The Industrial Innovations version was featured on the television series Mighty Morphin Power Rangers.
- A black model is used by Agent Grasso while searching for Amanda Givens' Jeep in Shadow Conspiracy (1997).
- Several boxes of the keyboard are seen in Teddy KGB's office near the end of the film Rounders (film) (1998).

== See also ==
- Keyboard technology
- List of human-computer interaction topics
- Computer keyboard
- Ergonomic keyboard
- Computer accessibility
- Carpal tunnel syndrome
- Repetitive strain injury
- Adaptive technology
