= Apple Adjustable Keyboard =

Keyboard by Apple Inc.

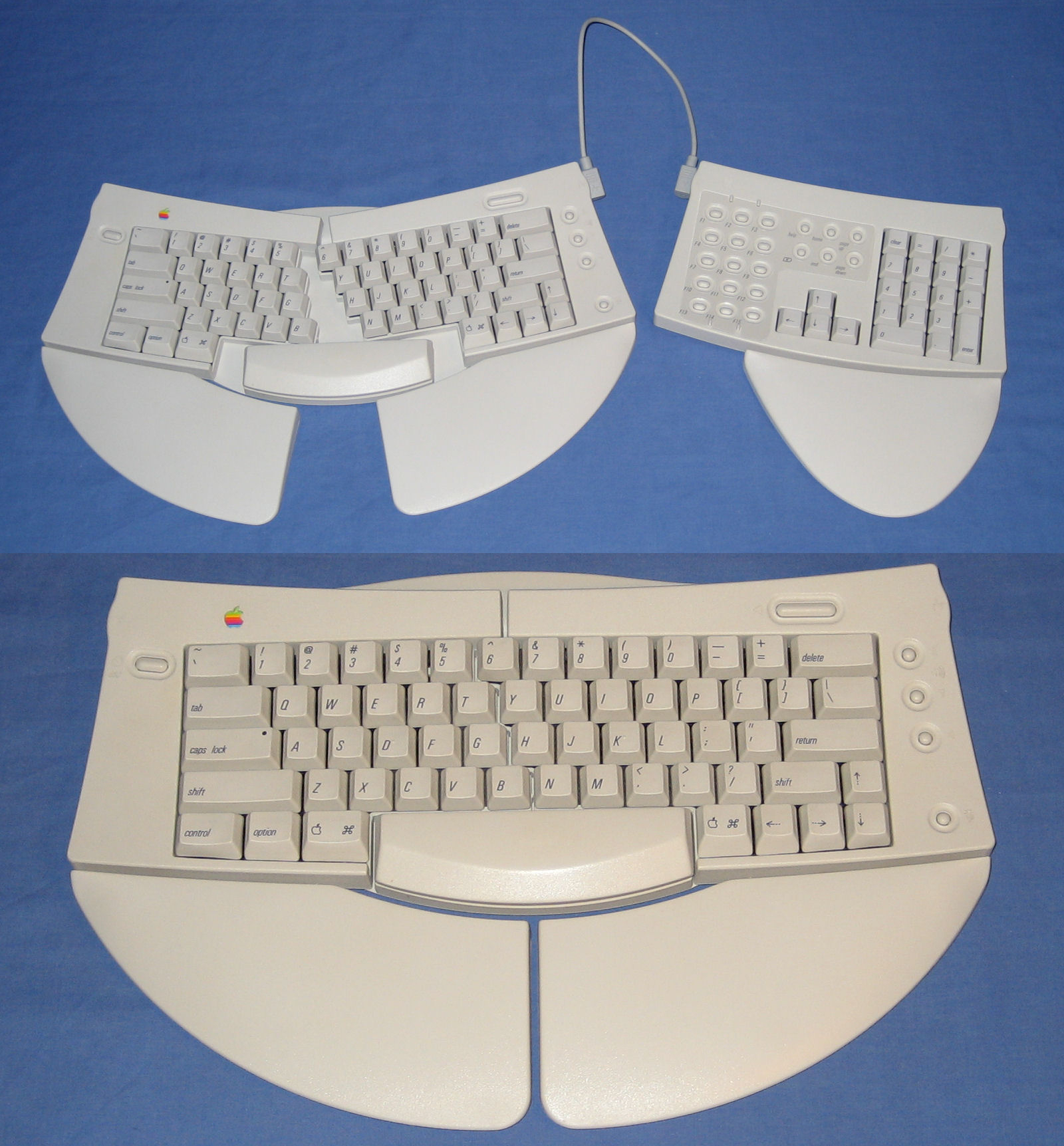
- Developer: Apple Computer
- Type: Ergonomic QWERTY keyboard
- Released: 1993
- Introductory price: US$219 (equivalent to $488.1 in 2025)

The Apple Adjustable Keyboard is an ergonomic keyboard introduced by Apple Computer, Inc. in 1993 for the Macintosh family of personal computers. The keyboard attaches to the computer via the Apple Desktop Bus port. The last Apple computer released compatible with this keyboard without using a USB to ADB adapter was the Power Macintosh G3 (Blue and White), as it was the last one with the Apple Desktop Bus.

The Apple Adjustable Keyboard came with contoured plastic wrist rests, and a separate keypad with function keys and arrow keys. This was the third and last time Apple offered a separate numeric keypad. Unlike its predecessors, it was not sold separately. The keyboard also included volume buttons and a record button on the right side of the keyboard.

It was hinged at the top, allowing the user to adjust the angle between the right and left sides of the keyboard. The split came between the key pairs: 5/6, T/Y, G/H, and B/N. The space bar floated midway between the two parts.

The keyboard uses Alps SKFS switches, which provide tactile feedback with a slightly "clicky" feel.

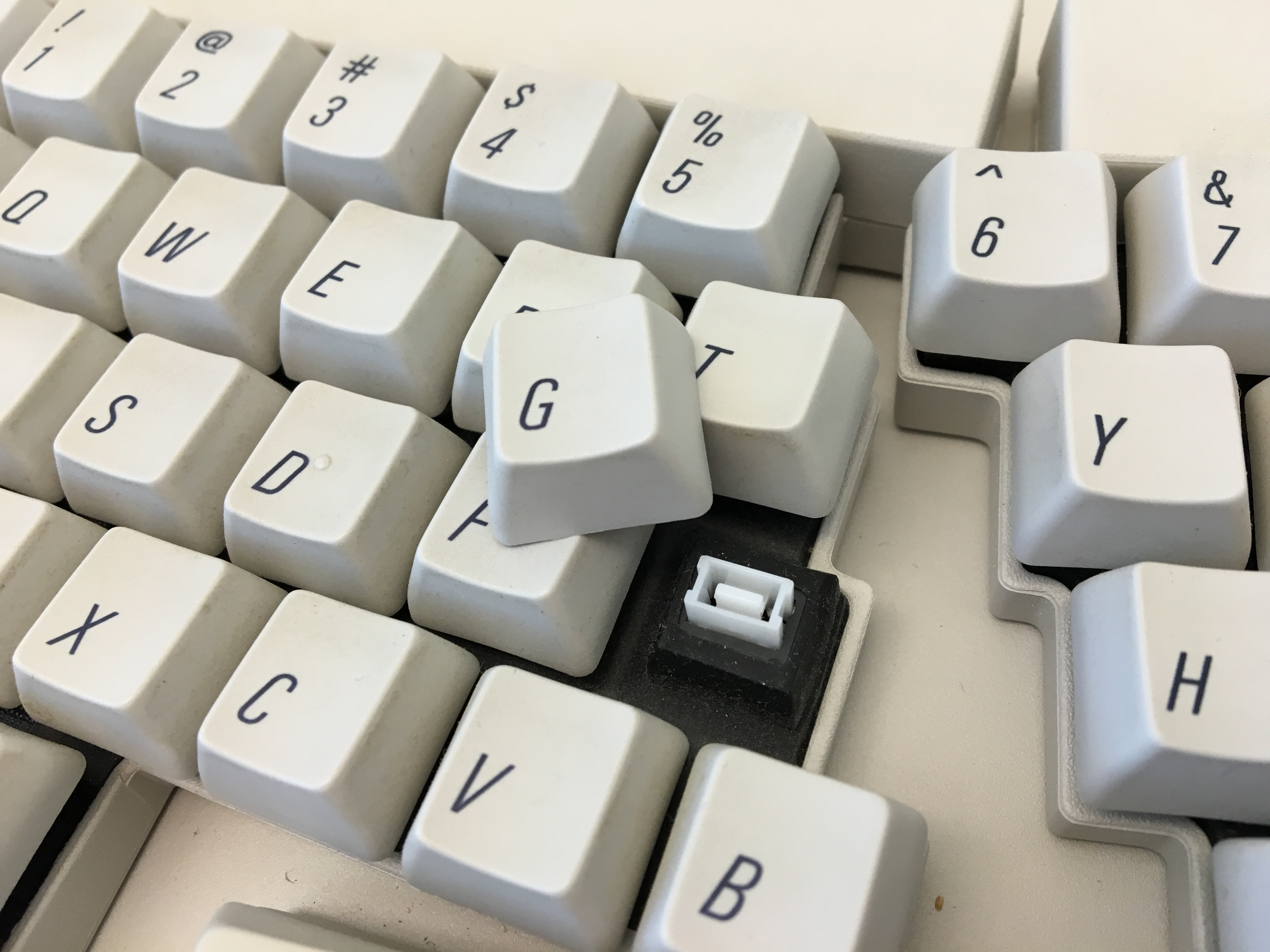
Apple Adjustable Keyboard with key switch exposed

== See also ==
- Apple Keyboard
- Ergonomic keyboard
  - Microsoft ergonomic keyboards
