= Repetitive strain injury software =

Repetitive strain injuries (RSI) are injuries to the body's muscles, joints, tendons, ligaments, bones, or nerves caused by repetitive movements. Such injuries are more likely if the movements required force or were accompanied by vibrations, compression, hyperextension, or the maintenance of sustained positions. Prolonged use of computer equipment can result in upper limb disorders, notably in the wrist or the back. RSIs are a subset of musculoskeletal disorders.

Various software is available to aid individuals in avoiding injury or manage current discomfort/injury associated with computer use.

== Software categories ==
Software for RSIs generally addresses these functional categories:

- Break reminder – Some tools are reminders to take breaks based on factors like elapsed time, how much or how intensely a person is working, natural rest patterns, and times of day.
- Activity mitigation – Some tools reduce the amount of typing or mouse clicking (e.g. speech recognition tools, automatic clicking tools, hotkey/macro tools).
- Tracking – Some tools track information, like time spent working each day, break-taking patterns, repetitions (e.g., keystrokes, mouse clicks). Some tools have much more sophisticated statistics, including predictive risk assessments based on fairly sophisticated and research-based methodologies. Some tools also include discomfort assessments and reporting tools to help in finding associative patterns between objectively collected statistics and subjectively reported discomfort information.
- Networking – Some tools are able to handle multiple-computer use (e.g., for profiles settings or for aggregating usage statistics) via networked data, including the ability to handle intermittent connectivity.
- Training – Some tools include a training component with information on topics including: workstation setup, body positioning, work-efficiency tips, and psycho-social information.

=== Break reminders ===
This can be an important component for many users. Considerations for selecting a tool include the mechanism the tools use to decide when alerts to take a break are needed, how to take a break, and how flexible the tool is.

Many tools are simple timers (e.g., reminders to rest every 60 minutes). That may work well if a job requires constant and consistent computer work, but can be distracting if work is not constantly on the computer. Other tools consider natural rests and delay break suggestions accordingly. Some tools also consider patterns in activity and will suggest breaks sooner or later depending on activity. These tools can be less frustrating to people whose computer work is interspersed with other activities throughout the day.

The various mechanisms for reminding you to take a break can include visual and audio indicators, workflow limiters (e.g. popup windows, screen dimmers), and much more. The best tools allow you to select which of these mechanisms you want to use.

Flexibility is important since each person has different needs. Some tools have extensive customization capability that allows you to configure exactly how and when breaks will be suggested. Features to enforce breaks can also be helpful to people who want to take breaks but whose personalities are such that they have a hard time stopping work. Some tools have advanced features like the ability to block break suggestions during some activities (e.g., when showing a presentation, or in full-screen mode).

=== Activity mitigation ===
Applications with these tools seek to mitigate the impact of particular activities by either changing or reducing the associated exposure.

This could involve changing or reducing input device use, improving a user interface to reduce stress, speeding up a process to reduce the time a user needs to be at the computer, etc.

An example of a tool that changes the impact would be speech recognition. Speech recognition replaces keyboard (and sometimes mouse) input with vocal input. This type of solution can be very helpful for reducing some types of strain, but it's important to recognize that another significant strain may be created.

An example of a tool that reduces the impact would be a hotkey tool or automatic clicking tool. These tools ideally reduce the number of keystrokes and mouse clicks that a user needs to accomplish a particular task.

An example of a tool that reduces the impact would also be breathing scrolling. Breathing scrolling requires no mouse or keyboard for scrolling. It uses micro-phone to scroll websites.

A tip, in order to use the mouse less often in the software menus, is to learn the keyboard shortcuts.

== See also ==
- List of speech recognition software
