= Scopist =

Person who edits transcripts of official proceedings

A scopist edits the transcripts of official proceedings, created by court reporters. Court reporters attend official proceedings such as court hearings and transcribe the spoken word to written text. Court reporters take down official proceedings using voice writing or stenography. Scopists receive the rough copies of these transcripts after the proceedings, check the transcript for missing words or mistakes, edit grammar and punctuation, ensure that proper names and technical or scientific terms are spelled correctly, and format the transcript properly before delivering the transcript back to the court reporter. Unlike most careers in the legal field, scopists can be outsourced as they are not directly involved in the legal process.

== Skills ==
Scopists need excellent grammar, punctuation, vocabulary, and research skills, as well as good knowledge of legal terminology, medical terminology, and transcript production. They are typically voracious readers, gatherers of eclectic knowledge, and adept users of technology.

== Training ==
The major court reporting associations in North America do not presently administer certification for scopists. However, scopist training is available through specialized schools of scopistry and through community colleges.

== Compensation ==
Scopists are typically paid by the page, starting from $1.00 to $1.50 per page. This amount increases for expedited transcripts (transcripts that need to be edited faster than usual) and for transcripts with a high density of medical or technical terminology (transcripts that require extra research).

== Risks ==
While scopists provide a court reporter with a valuable service, they can also pose a risk since a scopist is not required to hold any certifications. A scopist may attempt to "clean up" a transcript by fixing grammar and changing punctuation, which can cause the scopist to inadvertently change the record. Therefore, the final transcript is the responsibility of the stenographer who created the rough or "RASCII", and it is his or her responsibility to proofread the final copy before certifying it. A good court reporter will always have the final read of a transcript that a scopist finalizes.

== Work environment ==
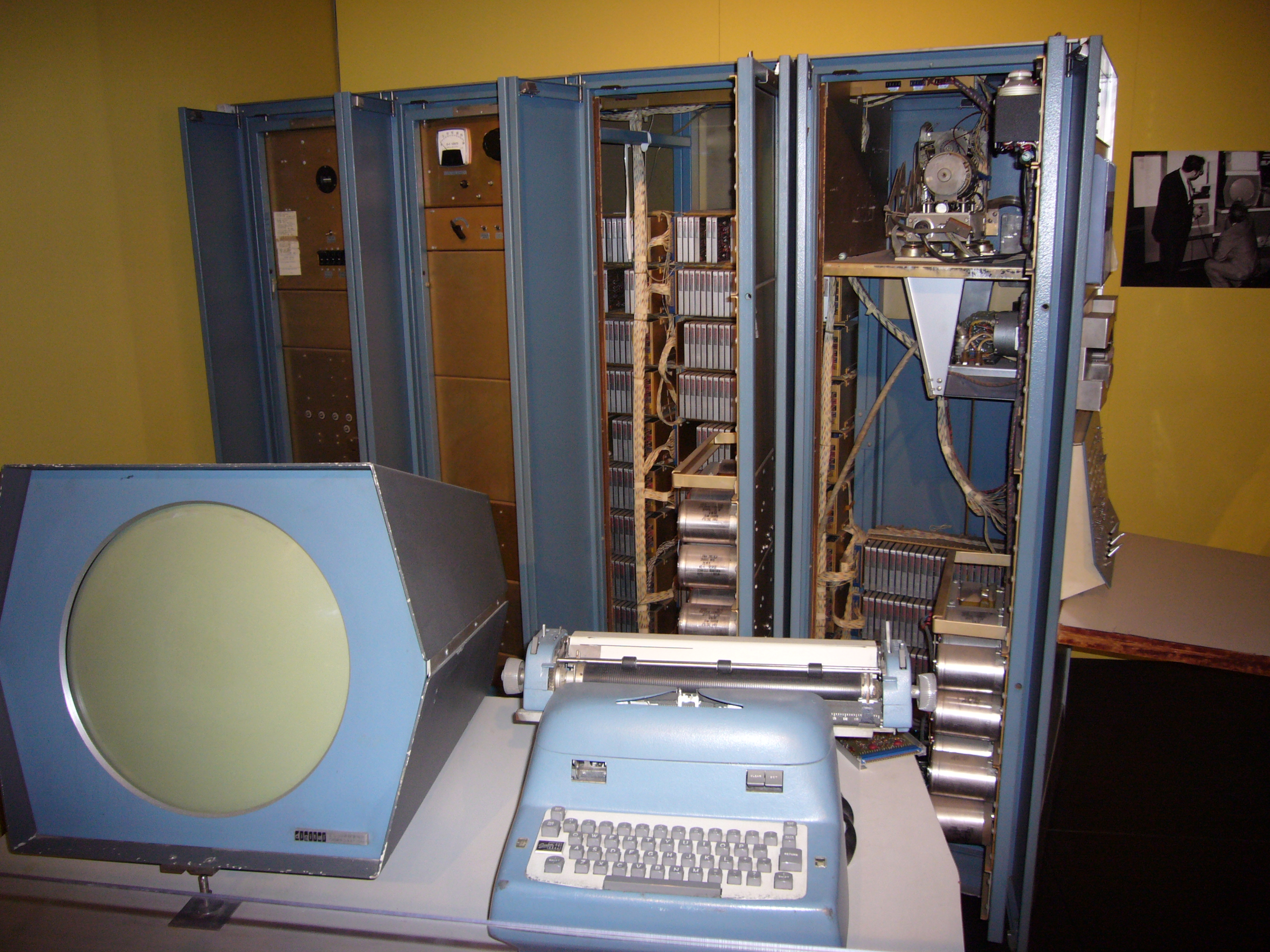
PDP-1 with "scope" display

The term "scopist" originated in the early days of computer-aided transcription. At that time, the shorthand transcripts produced by court reporters were translated into plain English on minicomputers belonging to courthouses or reporting firms. These computers had small green screens that displayed only six or eight lines of text at a time and resembled an oscilloscope. The screen became known as a "scope"; as a result, the people who worked at the "scope" to monitor the translation of the transcript became known as "scopists."

Most scopists are freelancers and remote workers, receiving court reporters’ transcripts and other materials electronically, via email and internet sites. This enables scopists to build their own clientele, set their own hours, and work for court reporters without the constraint of geographical location.
