= Certified Verbatim Reporter =

The Certified Verbatim Reporter (CVR) is a nationally recognized certification designation for court reporters in the United States. It is provided by the National Verbatim Reporters Association (NVRA).

There are two parts court reporters must pass in order to obtain an CVR certificate: a written knowledge test and a dictation speed skills test.

After completing the CVR test, reporters must maintain this certification by renewing NVRA membership and completing certain other requirements provided by the NVRA.

== Written Knowledge Test ==
The written knowledge test is a 100 question exam that evaluates a reporter's knowledge in court reporting, transcript production, operating practices, and professional issues and continuing education. The reporter has 90 minutes to take this section and must obtain a score of at least 70% to pass.

== Speed Skills Test ==
There are three categories evaluated in the speed skills test, each lasting five minutes long:

- Literary, at 180 words per minute (WPM)
- Jury Charge, at 200 WPM
- Testimony (or questions and answers), at 225 WPM

The reporter must obtain a 95% accuracy rate in each of these three parts in order to pass. Reporters have 75 minutes to transcribe each of the three parts.

== Requirements ==
In order to be allowed to partake in the examination, the candidate must be a high school graduate and provide documentary proof of high school graduation or passage of an independently administered test approved by the U.S. Secretary of Education. Documentation of a higher education degree is also acceptable. A passing score on the Written Knowledge Test is valid for a period of three years. After that date, holder must retake the Written Knowledge Test in order to achieve CVR score again. Passing scores on any segment of the Dictation Skills Test and a score of 90 or above on the CVR Written Knowledge Test will not expire provided continuous NVRA membership is maintained.
