= Twiddler =

- The original Twiddler model from 1992.
- Manufacturer: HandyKey Corporation (1992-2007); Tek Gear, Inc (2007-present)
- Released: 1992; 34 years ago

The Twiddler is a chorded keyboard and mouse allowing one to type with a single hand.

== History ==
The first Twiddler was launched in 1992 by the HandyKey Corporation. HandyKey was purchased in 2007 by the Canadian firm Tek Gear.

== Specification ==
The original Twiddler used a serial port for communication and a PC AT keyboard port for power. This was replaced with USB for the Twiddler 2.

The third generation Twiddler, the Twiddler 3, natively communicates using USB or Bluetooth and provides haptic feedback through an optionally installed module.

The fourth generation, the Twiddler 4, announced in 2024, will use USB-C or Bluetooth, and replaces the Twiddler 3's joystick with an optical trackpad.

== See also ==
- Velotype
