= Rough ASCII =

A rough ASCII, uncertified rough draft, uncertified unedited rough draft, realtime unedited rough draft, uncertified copy, or simply RASCII (/ˈræski/ RAS-kee) is the rough draft version of a transcript created by a court reporter, usually of a legal proceeding. It may have spelling errors as it has not yet been finalized. Once the transcript has been finalized and certified by the court reporter, the RASCII is then transformed into a so called "ASCII" (American Standard Code for Information Interchange).

A court reporter transcribes spoken or recorded speech into written form, using machine shorthand or voice writing equipment to produce official transcripts of court hearings, depositions and other official proceedings. If requested, the court reporter will go on to proofread and finalize the transcript before certifying it. Frequently a "Rough" copy will be requested to review before the final copy is created.

== See also ==
- Draft document
- Manuscript (publishing)
