= Microwriter =

Hand-held portable word-processor with a chording keyboard

The Microwriter is a hand-held portable word-processor with a chording keyboard. First demonstrated in 1978, it was invented by UK-based, US-born film director Cy Endfield and his partner Chris Rainey and was marketed in the early 1980s by Microwriter Ltd, of Mitcham, Surrey, UK. By using a mnemonic alphabet, its manufacturers stated it allowed note-taking of up to 8,000 characters at an input rate averaging 1.5 times that of handwriting.

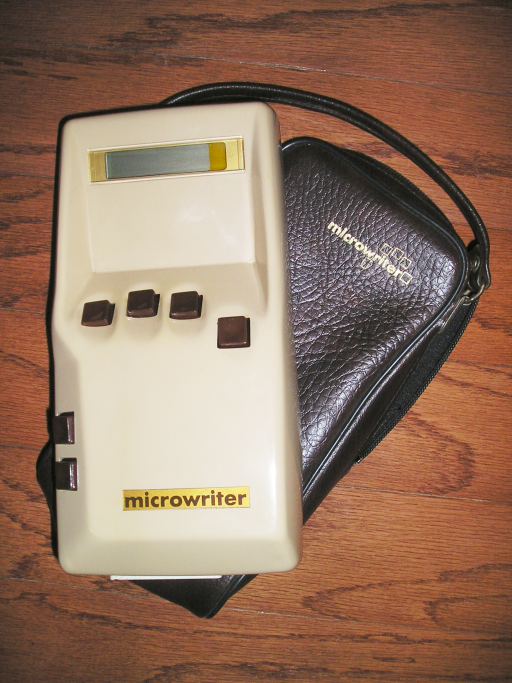
A Microwriter MW4 (circa 1980)

== The Microwriter MW4 ==
Although there was an earlier unit with an LED display, the MW4 with an LCD was the most common unit.

The 23 cm × 12 cm × 5 cm (9" x 5" x 2") device comprises:

- A six-button chording keyboard.
- A single line LCD.
- An 8 bit CDP1802 microprocessor.
- Complete Word processing software in ROM.
- 16 kilobytes of RAM.
- Rechargeable Nickel-cadmium batteries - sufficient to run the device for 30 hours.
- Various interfaces (see below).

This device is capable of allowing the user to enter and edit several pages of text - and by connecting a printer to the RS-232 serial port connector, documents can be printed without the aid of a separate computer. It was first sold in the UK in most mail-order shops in computing magazines such as Your Computer from Spring/Summer 1983 and cost around £400-£500 (equivalent to around £1500 in 2014).

=== Keyboard ===
The keyboard uses one button for each finger and two for the thumb of the user's right hand. The five buttons immediately beneath the fingers are pressed in different combinations to generate all letters. The second thumb button is used to toggle through a range of modes that allow the user to switch case, enter numbers, insert punctuation and even add ASCII control characters, to be used in editing the document being prepared. To type a letter "T", for example, the user would tap the top thumb button to shift to uppercase, then chord a "t" by pressing the index finger and ring finger buttons simultaneously.

The manufacturers claimed that most people could learn to use it in just a couple of hours. They claimed, with some practice, it was possible to become a faster typist with the Microwriter than with a conventional keyboard (providing that what is being entered is just text). Typing is slowed if a substantial number of special characters have to be entered using the "shifting" mechanism.

Learning the chords for the basic letters and numbers is facilitated by a set of flash-cards that show simple mnemonics for each character.

=== External ports ===
At the top end of the unit is a 25 pin D-type connector providing an RS-232 port, an interface to an audio cassette player for saving and restoring files and a small white on/off button. At the other end is the connector for the battery charger and a 37 pin D-type connector that can be hooked up to an optional external unit to allow the Microwriter to be connected to a television and thus to perform full-screen editing. The serial port can be used to connect the Microwriter directly to a printer, or to allow it to be plugged into a computer to function in place of the conventional keyboard.

=== Reception ===
Despite a lack of similar products, the Microwriter was not a success, and ceased production in 1985. Microwriters were sold direct, in the USA the advertised price was US$499.00 which might have been too high for a successful product offering. A total of 13,000 devices were reportedly sold before the product's discontinuation.

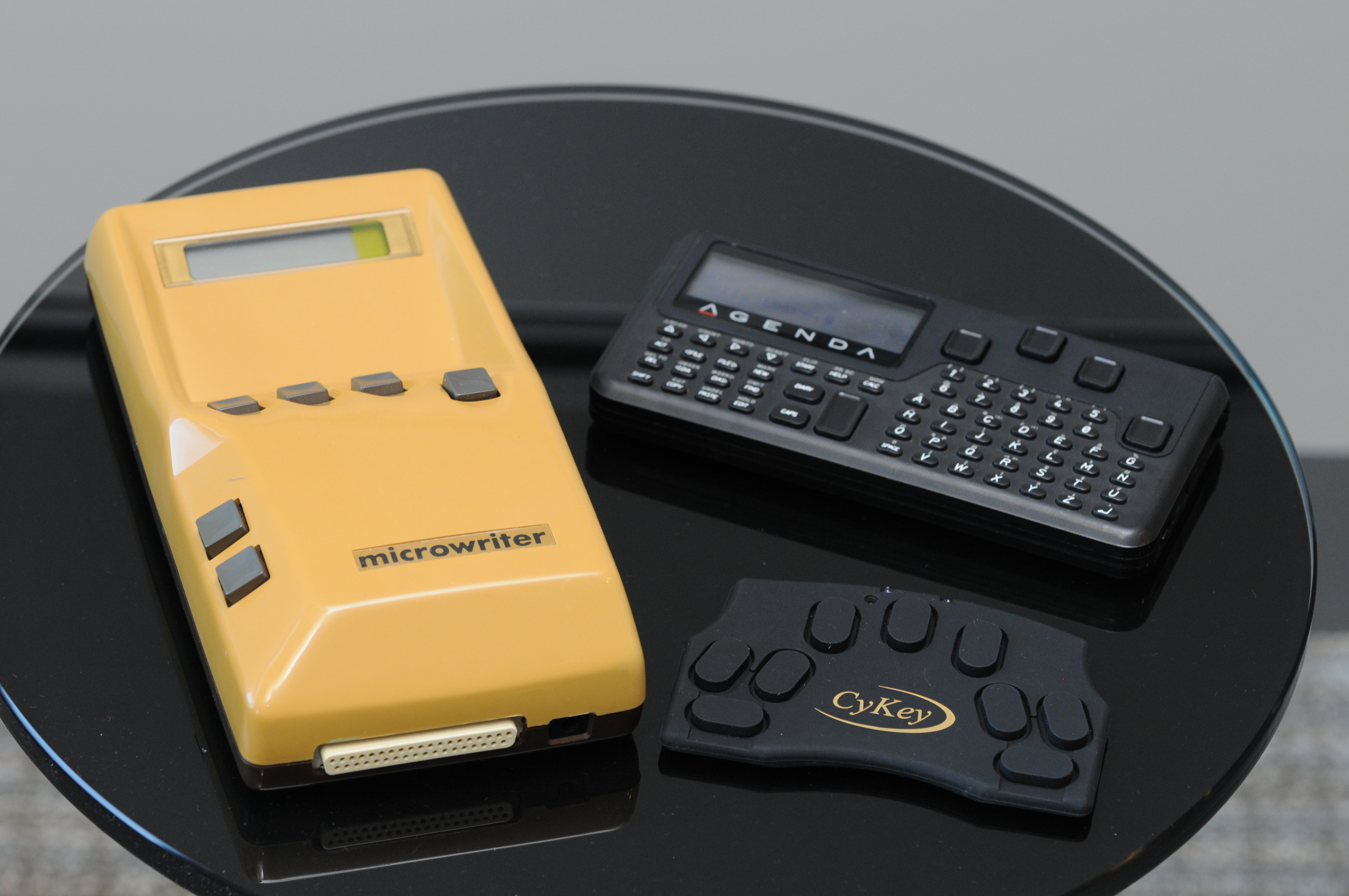
A MicroWriter, MicroWriter AgendA, and its modern successor the CyKey.

A cut-down version of the Microwriter, known as the "Quinkey", was sold as a keyboard add-on for the BBC Micro computer connecting via the analogue port. It came with a game that helped the user to learn the chords. There were two versions of the interface software, one optimised for entering BBC BASIC commands, the other for word processing. Later, drivers were created for the Amstrad CPC and PC1512 home computers that worked through the digital joystick ports, and a version for IBM PC's running MS-DOS that used the IBM RS-232 port control pins as a digital port for a 2x3 key matrix. These saw limited use.

== Microwriter AgendA ==
The Microwriter AgendA was one of the first PDAs. Released in 1989, it includes a set of small alphanumeric keys arranged inside the half circle of a Microwriter chording keyboard with larger keys. The alphabetic keys, in common with other organiser products of the era, are arranged from A to Z as opposed to employing a QWERTY or other typewriter layout. It has 32K of storage, pluggable memory modules, a 4-line LCD screen, and advertised excellent build quality and long battery life. It was designed for text-mode note-taking without a conventional desk or keyboard. In 1990 it was awarded the British Design Award. The Hitachi HD63A03Y, a reimplementation of the Motorola 6800, was used as the CPU.

Interface cables were available for the common serial (RS-232) and parallel (printer) ports of the day. These use a "smart" cable connected to a single I²C bus on the AgendA.

== CyKey ==
Chris Rainey, the co-inventor of Microwriter, re-introduced Microwriting for PC and Palm PDAs with a standalone miniature chording keyboard called CyKey. CyKey is named after the Microwriter chord system's co-inventor Cy Endfield.

== SiWriter ==
The SiWriter is an app for the iPad and iPhone which uses a close variant of the microwriter chording system developed by Cy Enfield. It is available via the Apple App Store.

The system is let down by the lack of haptic feedback - you can't tell if your fingers are in the right place without looking, but you get better with practice. The finger pad positions are adjustable to fit your hand size. It also works for left handed users and has a live speech output facility that could be helpful for people with speech impairments.

== See also ==
- Stenotype
