= CyKey =

One-handed chorded keyboard

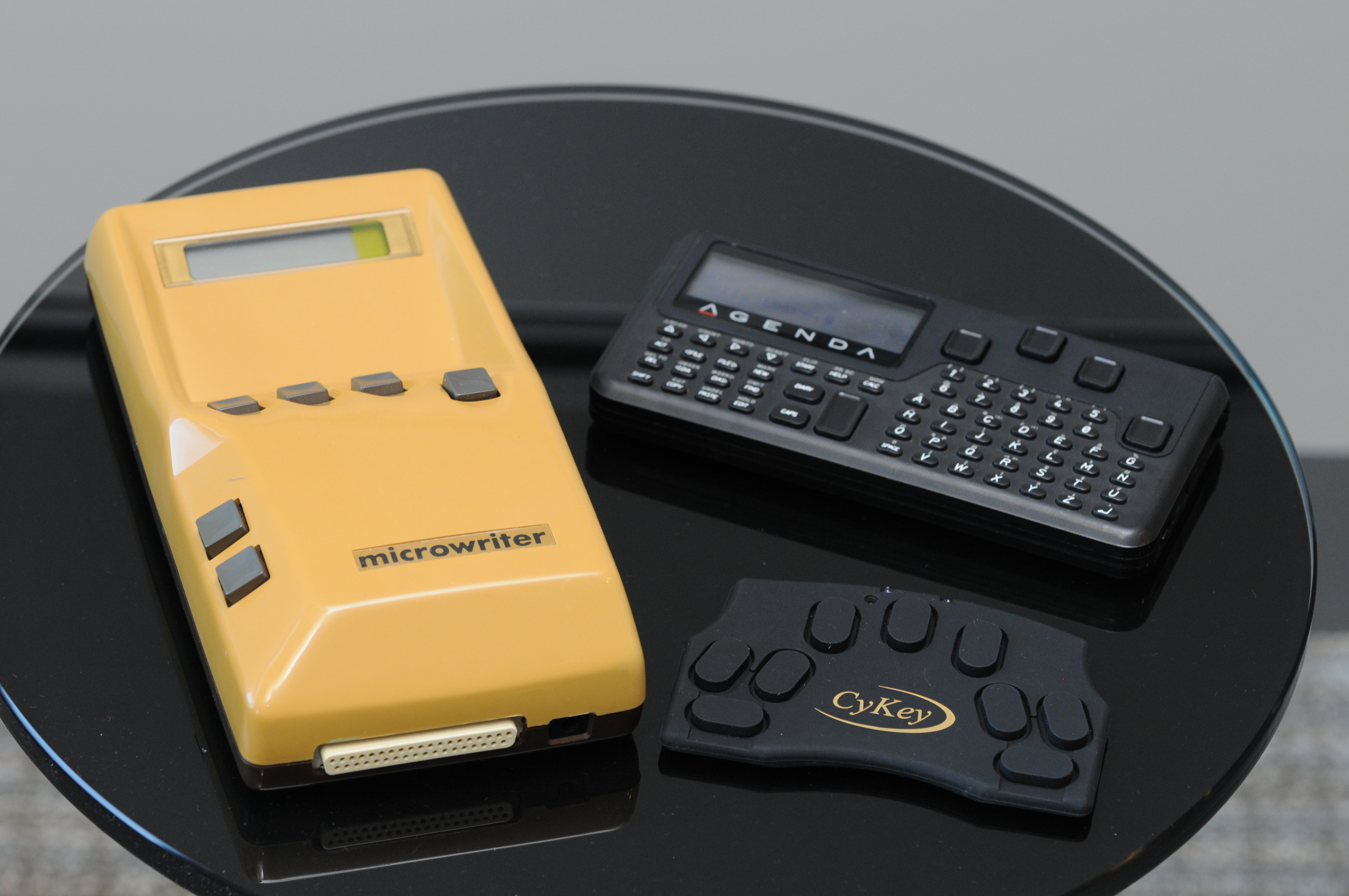
A CyKey (lower right), and its Microwriter predecessors.

CyKey (pronounced "sai-ki" or "psyche") is a one-handed chorded keyboard, catering to both left- and right-handed users. It features nine keys, grouped into three sets of three.

CyKey was introduced in 1996 by Bellaire Electronics. It was a follow-on to the Microwriter, meant to be used with personal computers and Palm PDAs. It was named after Cy Endfield, co-inventor of the Microwriter.
