= Thad Starner =

American computer scientist

- Known for: Wearable computing

Thad Eugene Starner is a founder and director of the Contextual Computing Group at Georgia Tech's College of Computing, where he is a full professor. He is a pioneer of wearable computing as well as human-computer interaction, augmented environments, and pattern recognition. Starner is a strong advocate of continuous-access, everyday-use systems, and has worn his own customized wearable computer continuously since 1993. His work has touched on handwriting and sign-language analysis, intelligent agents and augmented realities. He also helped found Charmed Technology.

== Biography ==
=== Education ===
Starner graduated from Dallastown Area High School in York PA in 1987 with honors. He won a talent show in technological science for one of the first AI puzzle-solving PC computer simulations in 1986 before high school graduation gaining him early recognition. Starner graduated from the Massachusetts Institute of Technology with a B.S. in Brain and Cognitive Science (1991), a B.S. in Computer Science (1991), a M.S. in Media Arts and Science, and finally a Ph.D. in Media Arts and Sciences (1999) from the MIT Media Laboratory. His doctoral work was entitled "Wearable Computing and Contextual Awareness," dealing with pattern recognition and how wearable computing can be utilized for purposes such as recognizing hand motions used in American Sign Language.

=== Wearable computing ===
Starner is probably most well known for being a strong advocate for wearable computing. During his time at the MIT Media Lab, Starner, already responsible for helping create one of the earliest high-accuracy online cursive handwriting recognition systems in 1993 as an associate scientist with BBN's Speech Systems Group, became one of the world's leading experts on the subject. Starner is also a co-founder of the IEEE International Symposium on Wearable Computers (ISWC) and co-founder and first member of the MIT Wearable Computing Project, where he was one of the first 6 cyborgs involved. Since 1993, Starner has been wearing his own customized wearable computer system full-time, arguably one of the longest, if not the longest, such instances. He designed the hardware for his system, dubbed "The Lizzy", based on designs of the wearable "hip PC" designed by Doug Platt, who built Starner's original wearable. The original system consisted of custom parts from a kit made by Park Enterprises, a Private Eye display, and a Twiddler chorded keyboard. As of January 29, 2008, Starner's setup has evolved to include a heads-up display showing 640x480 screen resolution, a Twiddler, and an OQO Model 1 Ultra-Mobile PC (though the specifications listed suggest an OQO Model 01+) with a GHz processor, 512 MB of RAM, 30GB hard disk, USB2, Firewire, and Wi-Fi built in, as well as a mobile phone with cellular Internet access as well.

Some of the benefits he receives from wearing a computer include being able to type and access the Internet while walking around or talking to others, allowing him to take notes on a conversation in real-time, opening up notes on a certain subject and e-mailing them at any time or even having two conversations at once, one online and one face to face, and if he comes across something he doesn't know or recognize, he can instantly find out. In addition to augmenting the outside world, having a computer on at all times improves Starner's nerves while giving talks; Starner has a speech impediment but is able to speak more clearly when prompted by a computer.

Starner is a Technical Lead/Manager on Google's Project Glass wearable computing project.

=== Other research ===
One of his prominent research focuses is the involvement of wearable computing with American Sign Language (ASL). His work intends to create a bridge between the deaf and hearing communities that will facilitate communication between the two using an ASL-to-English one-way translator. Starner is also researching dual-purpose speech, where a wearable computer will be able to interpret certain speech patterns and bring up appropriate programs, such as a calendar for scheduling appointments. In addition, Starner has been involved in the Aware Home project, which uses technology to create an interactive and personalizable environment within the home that would benefit individuals who wouldn't normally be able to live independently.

Starner and collaborators have also developed the Mobile Music Touch (MMT) system, a wearable vibrotactile glove intended to study passive tactile learning of finger sequences. A Georgia Tech, reported pilot study using a related musical-glove approach reported improved hand sensation and mobility in some people with spinal cord injury.

== Recognition ==
Starner was listed among Technology Review's TR100 top 100 remarkable innovators (now renamed TR35 and limited to thirty-five winners) in 1999. He was named as an ACM Fellow, in the 2024 class of fellows, "for contributions to and leadership in the wearable computing research community".
