= Stenomask =

Microphone in a soundproof mask

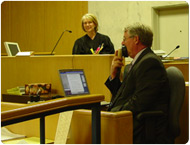
Court reporter tests his stenomask.

A stenomask is a hand-held microphone built into a padded, soundproof enclosure that fits over the speaker's mouth or nose. Some lightweight versions may be fitted with an elastic neck strap to hold them in place while freeing the user's hands for other tasks. The purpose of a stenomask is to allow a person to speak without being heard by other people, and to keep background noise away from the microphone. It's a microphone with the ability to filter out background noise.

A stenomask is useful for speech recognition applications, because it allows voice transcription in noisy environments. Perhaps more importantly, a stenomask silences the user's voice so that it does not interfere with the surrounding environment such as a court or a classroom. The user can verbally identify the speaker, indicate gestures and unspoken answers, and describe activities as they take place.

An operator of a stenomask can be trained to "re-voice" everything they hear into a stenomask connected to a speech recognition system, for a real-time text transcription of everything spoken. This allows a "voice writer" to produce instant text feeds within a courtroom and distribute them in plain text format immediately after a proceeding. The equipment can also interface with litigation management software.

A trained operator using a stenomask connected to a pre-trained speech recognition system can exceed 180 words per minute while at the same time exceeding 95 percent accuracy. They may also modify the pronunciation of the words they are speaking in order to improve accuracy.

In comparison to conventional approaches like Gregg shorthand and stenotype technology, the main disadvantage of stenomask technology is the distinctive visual appearance of the operator when speaking into the stenomask.

Microphones that work much like a stenomask are used by aircraft ground crews to communicate with cockpit crews in airport environments with extreme engine noise, and are usually part of their headsets.

== History ==
The stenomask was developed by Horace Webb and two colleagues in the early 1940s. He was proficient with Gregg shorthand, but sought a more accurate and faster system of transcription, as shorthand notes can become unmanageable with fast talkers or difficult terminology. Furthermore, until speech recognition software became accurate enough for everyday use in the mid-1990s, shorthand reporters would verbally dictate transcription notes into typewritten form, resulting in about two hours dictation for every hour transcribing.

Thus, Webb thought he could "repeat it with my voice instead of with a pen". After much experimentation — first with a cigar box and then a tomato juice can — he arrived at a solution using a microphone inside a military aviator's rubber oxygen mask, paired with a coffee pot filled with sound-absorbing material. The result was eventually deemed by the United States Navy to be the most accurate method of transcription among "all known systems of verbatim reporting", and was subsequently adopted for use in their court reporting.
