= Real-time transcription =

Real-time transcription is the general term for transcription by court reporters using real-time text technologies to deliver computer text screens within a few seconds of the words being spoken. Specialist software allows participants in court hearings or depositions to make notes in the text and highlight portions for future reference.

Real-time transcription is also used in the broadcasting environment where it is more commonly termed "captioning."

== Career opportunities ==
Real-time reporting is used in a variety of industries, including entertainment, television, the Internet, and law.

Specific careers include the following:

- Judicial reporters use a stenotype to provide instant transcripts on computer screens as a trial or deposition occurs.
- Communication access real-time translation (CART) reporters assist the hearing-impaired by transcribing spoken words, giving them personal access to the communications they need day to day.
- Television broadcast captioners use real-time reporting technology to allow hard-of-hearing or deaf people to see what is being said on live television broadcasts such as news, emergency broadcasts, sporting events, awards shows, and other programs.
- Internet information (or Webcast) reporters provide real-time reporting of sales meetings, press conferences, and other events, while simultaneously transmitting the transcripts to computers worldwide.
- Other rapid data entry positions.

== History ==
Before the advent of the stenotype machine, court reporters wrote official trial transcripts by hand using a shorthand system of stenoforms that could later be translated into readable English. It often took eight years of training to learn this manual form of writing at the necessary speed. Walter Heironimus was among the first stenographers to make use of the stenotype machine during his work in the U.S. District Court system in New Jersey in 1935.

A "transcript crisis" arose during the later half of the twentieth century due to the increasing volume of lawsuits. There were not enough number of court reporters to match the increasing number of trials. Not only were court reporters unavailable to attend many court proceedings, court transcripts were constantly late and the qualities varied. Some believed it was due to the non-interchangeability between court reporters, and others believed it was simply due to a labor shortage. In the meantime, magnetic audiotape recording, or known as electronic recording (ER) began to threaten all reporters' job since it could record long-hour courtroom trials and replace a court reporter's position in the courtroom. As a result, machine translation (MT) intended to serve as a solution for preventing ER from potentially replacing reporters' jobs. However, MT relied heavily on human labors operating behind the system and many started to question if it should be the right way to end the "transcript crisis." Later in 1964, set up by CIA, the Automatic Language Processing Advisory Committee (ALPAC) was set to review whether MT was capable of solving this crisis. They concluded that MT had failed to do so. Then Patrick O'Neill, a skilled and experienced court reporter, stayed to work on the stenotype-translation project with CIA and developed the prototype CAT system. After adopting the CAT system in court-reporting community, CAT was brought into the television broadcasting system, aiming to provide captions for the deaf or hard-of-hearing communities. In 1983, Linda Miller developed a further use for the CAT system. She successfully translated a lecture live on the television screen and provided a transcript for students. This technique is known as Computer-Aided Real-time Translation, or CART.

== Court reporter ==
It is the court reporter's job to note down the exact words spoken by every participants during a court or deposition proceeding. Then court reporters will provide verbatim transcripts. The reason to have an official court transcript is that the real-time transcriptions allows attorneys and judges to have immediate access to the transcript. It also helps when there's a need to look up for information from the proceeding. Additionally, the deaf and the hard-of-hearing communities can also participate in the judicial process with the help of real-time transcriptions provided by court reporters.

=== Education and training ===
The required degree level for a court reporter to have is an Associate's degree or postsecondary certificate.

In order to become a court reporter, more than 150 reporter training programs are provided at proprietary schools, community colleges, and four-year universities. After graduation, court reporters can choose to further pursue certifications to achieve a higher level of expertise and increase their marketability during a job search. In most states, Certificates of Proficiency from the NCRA or from state agencies are now required certificates for court reporters to have in order to qualify for appointments. The NCRA aims to set the national standard for the certification of court reporters, and since 1937 it has offered its certification program which is now accepted by 22 states instead of state licenses.

Court reporter training programs include but not limited to:

- Training in rapid writing skill, or shorthand, which will enable students to record, with accuracy, at least 225 words per minute
- Training in typing, which will enable students to type at least 60 words per minute
- A general training in English, which covers aspects of grammar, word formation, punctuation, spelling and capitalization
- Taking Law related courses in order to understand the overall principles of civil and criminal law, legal terminology and common Latin phrases, rules of evidence, court procedures, the duties of court reporters, the ethics of the profession
- Visits to actual trials
- Taking courses in elementary anatomy and physiology and medical word study including medical prefixes, roots and suffixes.

Other than official court reporters, who are assigned to and work for a particular court, other types of court reporters include free-lance reporter, who either works for a court reporting firm or self-employed. They are different from official court reporters in that they have the chances to work on a wider range of assignments and work on basis of hourly wage. Hearing reporters work at governmental agency hearings. Legislative reporters work in law-making bodies. The demand for reporters is not limited in just the court settings. Reporters are also needed in conferences, meetings, conventions, investigations, and a variety of industries with needs for employers with real-time data entry skills.

== Non-English transcription ==
Transcription services are universally necessary, so it is not limited to the English language. A stenographer's ability to transcribe languages beyond only English is especially valuable as society as a whole becomes increasingly multilingual. Education in non-English transcription demands a comprehensive understanding of the given language. Phonetic differences between English and other languages are a particular challenge in carrying English transcription skills over into other languages. Stenography represents various sounds of a language in a formal system of shorthand, so differences within the sets of sounds that emerge in other languages require an alternative system of shorthand transcription. For example, the presence of many diphthongs and triphthongs in Spanish requires certain sounds to be distinguished that would not be present in transcribing English into shorthand.

== Controversies ==
The usage of transcription in the context of linguistic discussions has been controversial. Typically, two kinds of linguistic records are considered to be scientifically relevant. First, linguistic records of general acoustic features, and secondly, records that only focuses on the distinctive phonemes of a language. While transcriptions are not entirely illegitimate, transcriptions without enough detailed commentary regarding any linguistic features, or transcriptions of poor quality resources, has a great chance of the content being misinterpreted. Besides misinterpretation, transcribers could also bring in cultural biases and ignorance that reflect onto their transcription. These instances may cause a disruption of reliability in the final real-time transcription, which could influence how the written utterance is seen as an evidence for a court-case.

=== Quality issues ===
Problems in the final resulting transcription can be caused by either the quality of the transcriber or the original source that is being transcribed. Transcribers can come from different levels of skill and training background. This makes the final transcription prone to poor quality, or if the transcription is being done by multiple people, lack of consistency in the content.

If the source of the transcription is a recording, the problem may root back to the quality of the recording device (mechanical failure, battery loss, etc.) or the clarity of the recording itself (background noise, poor placement of the recorder, etc.).

=== Dialects ===
The displaying of a dialect in transcription highlights a complication within transcription. The fundamental problem with this situation is that the transcribed product is not simply a spoken language in its written form, but a language that has been transcribed by someone other than the speaker, no matter the level of understanding the transcriber has for the spoken language. Any transcription is an interpretation of the speech no matter how detailed it is, and will be selective in what it can include, leaves out and ultimately convey to the reader. A way to supplement a transcription of dialectic speech is to provide phonetic information. However, without any knowledge on phonetic notation or a chart that serves as a key to the symbols used, the information can become irrelevant for use as a transcription. Dialects will be noted when it is well recognized, such as socially stereotyped dialects like doin' for doing.

Besides phonetic differences that may lead to misinterpretation, transcribers also have to consider the nuanced social and emotional meanings that are specific to the speaker at the time and or the culture surrounding the dialect.

- Yihknow so I (haven't been) even takin' a train in (the morning).

The words in parentheses are considered misheard, but that can also be how the syntax works in the dialect. This example from J. Maxwell Atkinson and John Heritage (1984) shows the dilemma of doubt in accuracy of interpreting a dialect in the final transcript. Court reporters also have the tendency to correct the speaker's grammar, which can also be the case if the speaker is speaking in a colloquial dialect. This can cause more doubt in the accuracy of the transcription, especially if the reporter is translating the dialect into the wrong equivalent of standard language.

== Bibliography ==
- Bove, A. (1920). Spanish Stenography. Hispania, 3(5), 255-257. doi:10.2307/330898
- Court Reporter: How Do I Become a Court Reporter? (n.d.). Retrieved from https://study.com/articles/Court_Reporter_How_Do_I_Become_a_Court_Reporter.html
- Downey, G. (2006). Constructing "Computer-Compatible" Stenographers: The Transition to Real-Time Transcription in Courtroom Reporting. Technology and Culture, 47(1), 1-26.
- Hennink, M., & Weber, M. B. (2013). Quality issues of court reporters and transcriptionists for qualitative research. Qualitative health research, 23(5), 700–710. https://doi.org/10.1177/1049732313481502
- Hughes, B. G. (1983). Oklahoma State University, Edmond.
- National Court Reporters Association. (n.d.). What is Court Reporting? Retrieved from https://www.ncra.org/home/professionals_resources/professional-advantage/Court-Reporting
- National Court Reporters Association. (n.d.). Certification. Retrieved from https://www.ncra.org/certification
- Ochs, E., & Schieffelin, B. B. (1979). Development pragmatics. New York: Academic Press.
- Oscar Rose Junior College. (n.d.) Court Reporting Questions and Answers.
- R.-M. S. Heffner. (1934). Concerning Transcription. Language, 10(3), 286-290. doi:10.2307/409478
- Ronald K. S. Macaulay. (1991). "Coz It Izny Spelt When They Say It": Displaying Dialect in Writing. American Speech, 66(3), 280-291. doi:10.2307/455800
- Transcription Jobs HQ. (2020). Real-time Transcription. Retrieved from http://transcriptionjobshq.com/real-time-transcription/
