= CharaChorder =

US computer keyboard company

Charachorder
- Company type: Private
- Industry: Consumer electronics
- Founded: June 1, 2019; 6 years ago in Plano, Texas, U.S.
- Key people: Riley Keen (CEO); Monica Keen (CFO); Adan Arriaga (CCO); Matt Swarts (CTO)
- Products: CharaChorder One; CharaChorder Lite
- Website: www.charachorder.com

CharaChorder is an American privately held company that specializes in text input devices. Its major products include the CharaChorder One, CharaChorder Two, and the CharaChorder Lite, which are keyboards that allow for character and chorded entry.

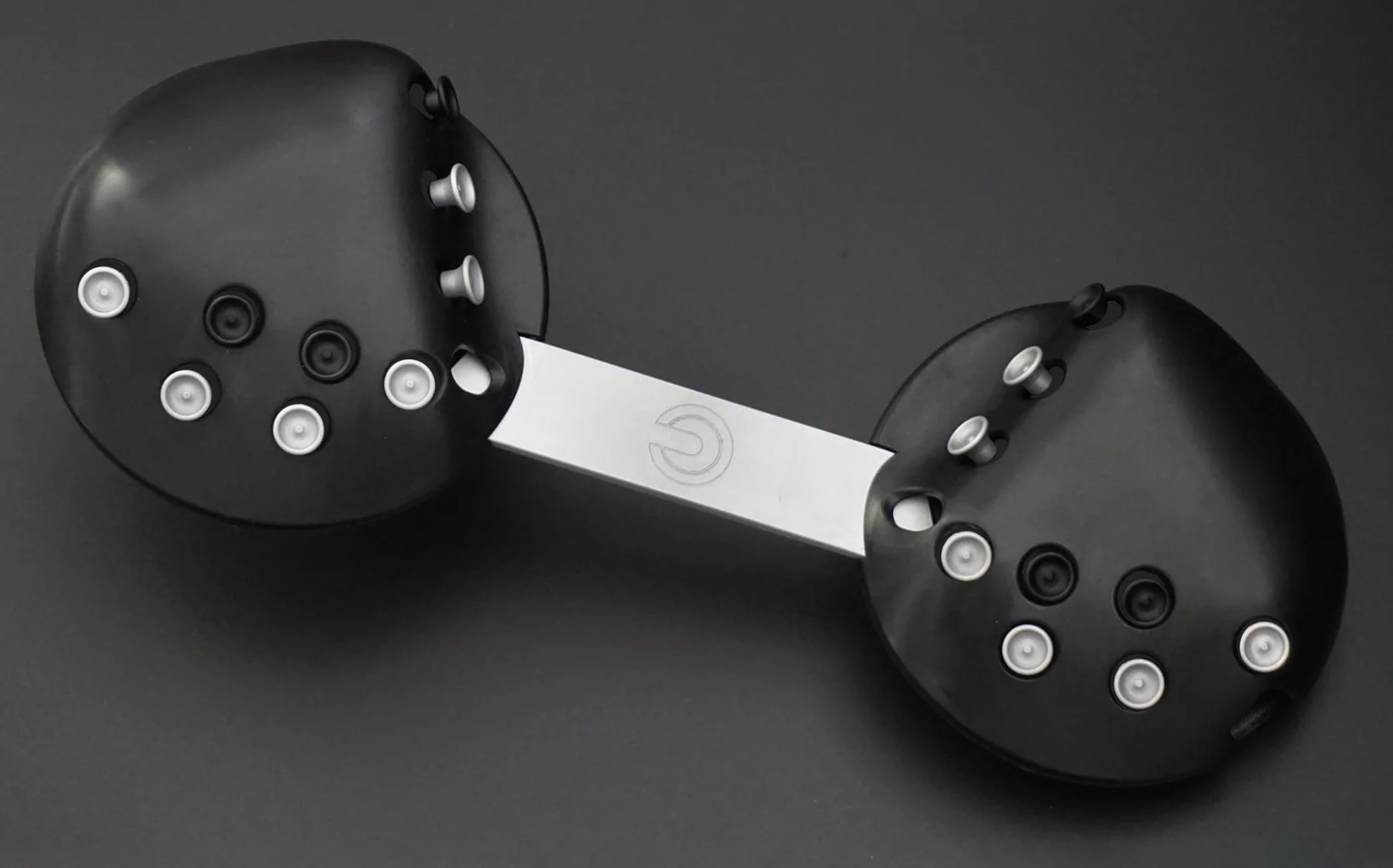
The CharaChorder One Keyboard

== History ==
The company's first product was the CharaChorder One, intended to assist people with disabilities and those with limited mobility the ability to communicate with ease. The founders cite their creation as an example of the curb cut effect: technology designed to enable people with disabilities that leads to benefits for everyone. After its initial release, the company was recognized as a new and noteworthy company at the consumer electronics show.

In January 2022, the company made the news when its CEO posted videos to social media demonstrating himself typing in excess of 500 wpm.

Since its initial creation the company has focused on creation of technologies that enable users to perform text entry faster. The company's motto is "typing at the speed of thought." In May 2022, the company began publicly selling the CharaChorder Lite. The CharaChorder Lite is a chorded keyboard that allows for much of the same functionality of a CharaChorder One, with a more familiar QWERTY layout. In November 2022, the company began a Kickstarter campaign to fund the development of the CharaChorder X, a USB device that aims to bring chorded functionality to existing keyboards. It has now produced the engine used for chording, and is working on the "Forge" keyboard.
