= BAT keyboard =

Chording keyboard

A BAT keyboard is a one-handed chording keyboard consisting of a base, on which the hand rests, and seven keys. Through pressing combinations of keys, one can attain the same functions as a regular keyboard.

The keyboard can be useful for those with a disability and also as a complement to the mouse, on which the other hand can remain. The BAT keyboard exists in left-handed and right-handed versions, which can also be used simultaneously with each other or even with another alphanumeric keyboard if desired.

== See also ==
- Chorded keyboard
