= South Coast College =

For-profit technical college in California

- Type: Private for-profit technical college
- Established: 1961
- Dean: Jean Gonzalez, BA, MA
- Location: Orange, California, California, United States; 33°47′18″N 117°52′26″W
- Campus: Urban
- Website: www.southcoastcollege.edu

South Coast College is a private for-profit technical college in Orange, California. It offers certificates for career preparation in court reporting and medical assistant careers and a paralegal Associate of Arts degree. It is accredited by the Accrediting Commission of Career Schools and Colleges and approved by the Bureau for Private Postsecondary Education in the state of California, for court reporting, paralegal, and medical assistant programs.

== History ==
H. S. Whitley founded the Stenotype School of Long Beach in 1961 as its director-owner. A private college, it relocated to Westminster and was renamed Whitley College of Court Reporting. Whitley College merged again, in 1980, with Orange County College of Court Reporting and was re-named South Coast College. The college relocated to Anaheim in 1993 and, in 2001, to its facility in the city of Orange.

== Academics ==
South Coast College offers certificates in court reporting and medical assisting, as well as a paralegal Associate of Arts degree. The court reporting program is approved by the National Court Reporters Association.
