= Chorded keyboard =

Computer input device

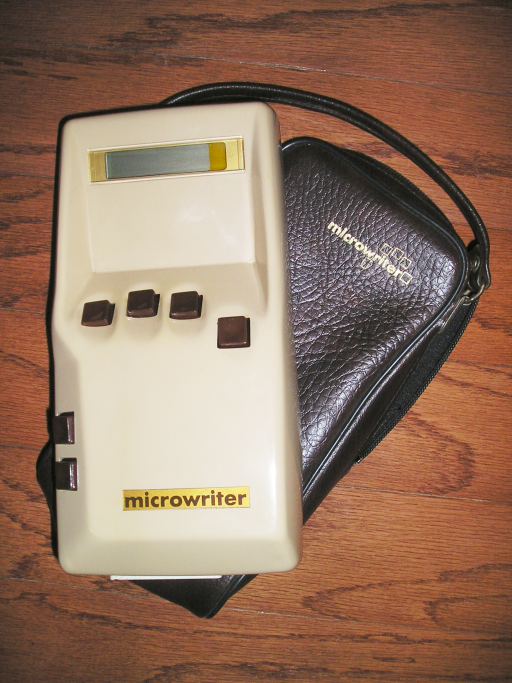
A Microwriter MW4 (circa 1980)

A keyset or chorded keyboard (also called a chorded keyset, chord keyboard or chording keyboard) is a computer input device that allows the user to enter characters or commands formed by pressing several keys together, like playing a "chord" on a piano. The large number of combinations available from a small number of keys allows text or commands to be entered with one hand, leaving the other hand free. A secondary advantage is that it can be built into a device (such as a pocket-sized computer or a bicycle handlebar) that is too small to contain a normal-sized keyboard.

A chorded keyboard minus the board, typically designed to be used while held in the hand, is called a keyer. Douglas Engelbart introduced the chorded keyset as a computer interface in 1968 at what is often called "The Mother of All Demos".

== Principles of operation ==
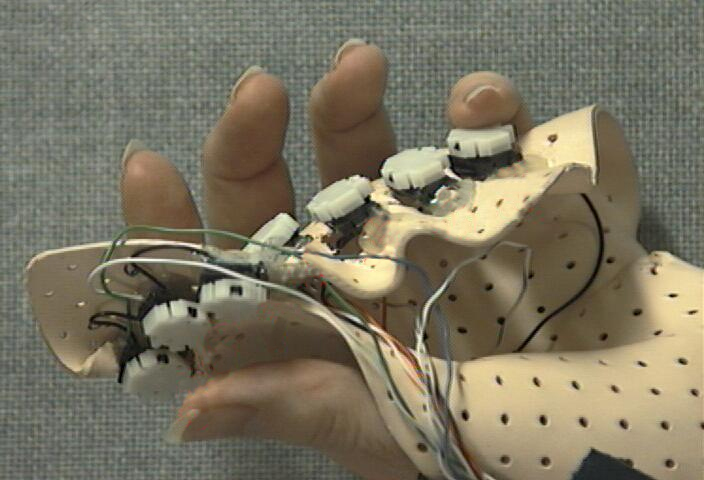
An ergonomic chorded keyboard without the board is known as a keyer.

Each physical key is mapped to a number and each desired output (letter or command) is also mapped to a number. Each key can generate an output character on its own, but by pressing two or more keys in combination the user can generate more output characters than they are physical keys. Typically, a keypress is not registered until all depressed keys are released - such that all keys do not need to be pressed at once as long as one key remains depressed throughout; when the last key is released the corresponding character is output based on all keys that had been depressed since the last character was registered.

In Engelbart's original mapping, he used five keys: 1, 2, 4, 8, 16. The output characters were mapped as follows: a = 1, b = 2, c = 3, and so on. If the user pressed keys 1 and 2 simultaneously, and then released the keys, the letter corresponding to 3 (the sum of 1 and 2) would be registered and, since C is the 3rd letter of the alphabet, the letter "c" appeared. It would be equally valid to press and hold the 1 key, briefly press and release the 2 key, and then finally release the 1 key - the total of 3, and thus the output character "c", would be the same as if all keys had been depressed simultaneously. Since Engelbart introduced the keyset, several different designs have been developed based on similar concepts.

As a crude example, each finger might control one key which corresponds to one bit in a byte, so that using seven keys and seven fingers, one could enter any character in the ASCII set—if the user could remember the binary codes. Due to the small number of keys required, chording is easily adapted from a desktop to mobile environment.

Practical devices generally use simpler chords for common characters (e.g., Baudot), or may have ways to make it easier to remember the chords (e.g., Microwriter), but the same principles apply. These portable devices first became popular with the wearable computer movement in the 1980s.

Thad Starner from Georgia Institute of Technology and others published numerous studies showing that two-handed chorded text entry was faster and yielded fewer errors than on a QWERTY keyboard. Currently stenotype machines hold the record for fastest word entry. Many stenotype users can reach 300 words per minute. However, stenographers typically train for three years before reaching professional levels of speed and accuracy.

== History ==
The earliest known chord keyboard was part of the "five-needle" telegraph operator station, designed by Wheatstone and Cooke in 1836, in which any two of the five needles could point left or right to indicate letters on a grid. It was designed to be used by untrained operators (who would determine which keys to press by looking at the grid), and was not used where trained telegraph operators were available.

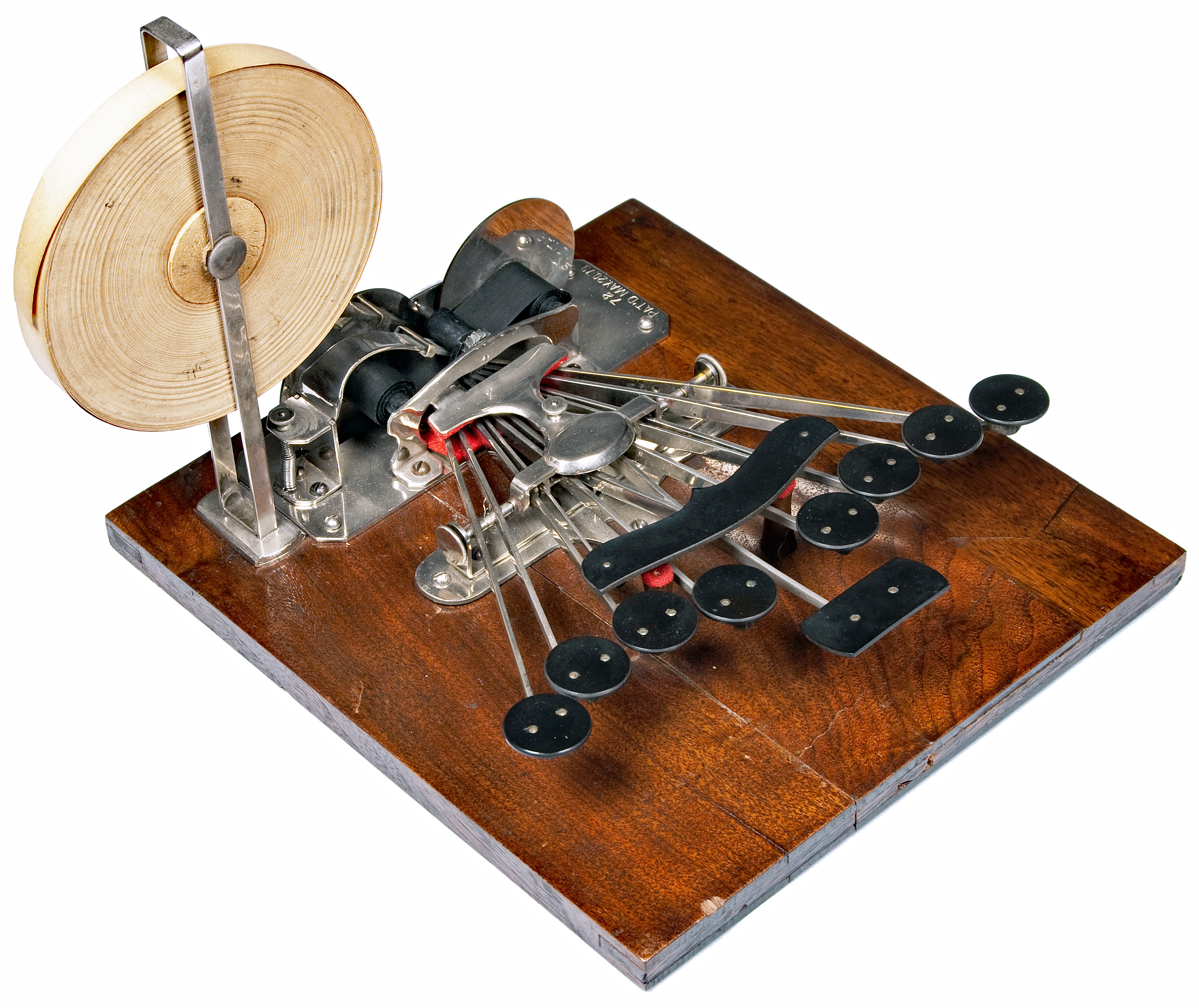
Stenograph first model, Miles Bartholomew, 1879

The first widespread use of a chord keyboard was in the stenotype machine used by court reporters, which was invented in 1868 and is still in use. The output of the stenotype was originally a phonetic code that had to be transcribed later (usually by the same operator who produced the original output), rather than arbitrary text—automatic conversion software, which is now commonplace.

In 1874, the five-bit Baudot telegraph code and a matching 5-key chord keyboard was designed to be used with the operator forming the codes manually. The code is optimized for speed and low wear: chords were chosen so that the most common characters used the simplest chords. But telegraph operators were already using typewriters with QWERTY keyboards to "copy" received messages, and at the time it made more sense to build a typewriter that could generate the codes automatically, rather than making them learn to use a new input device.

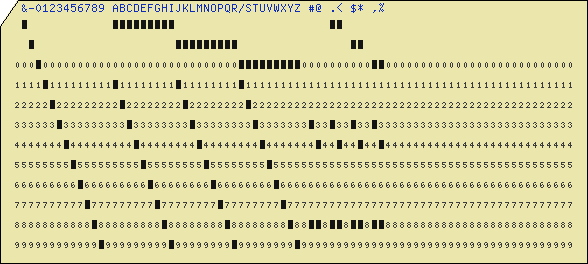
IBM 026 commercial card code

Some early keypunch machines used a keyboard with 12 labeled keys to punch the correct holes in paper cards. The numbers 0 through 9 were represented by one punch; 26 letters were represented by combinations of two punches, and symbols were represented by combinations of two or three punches.

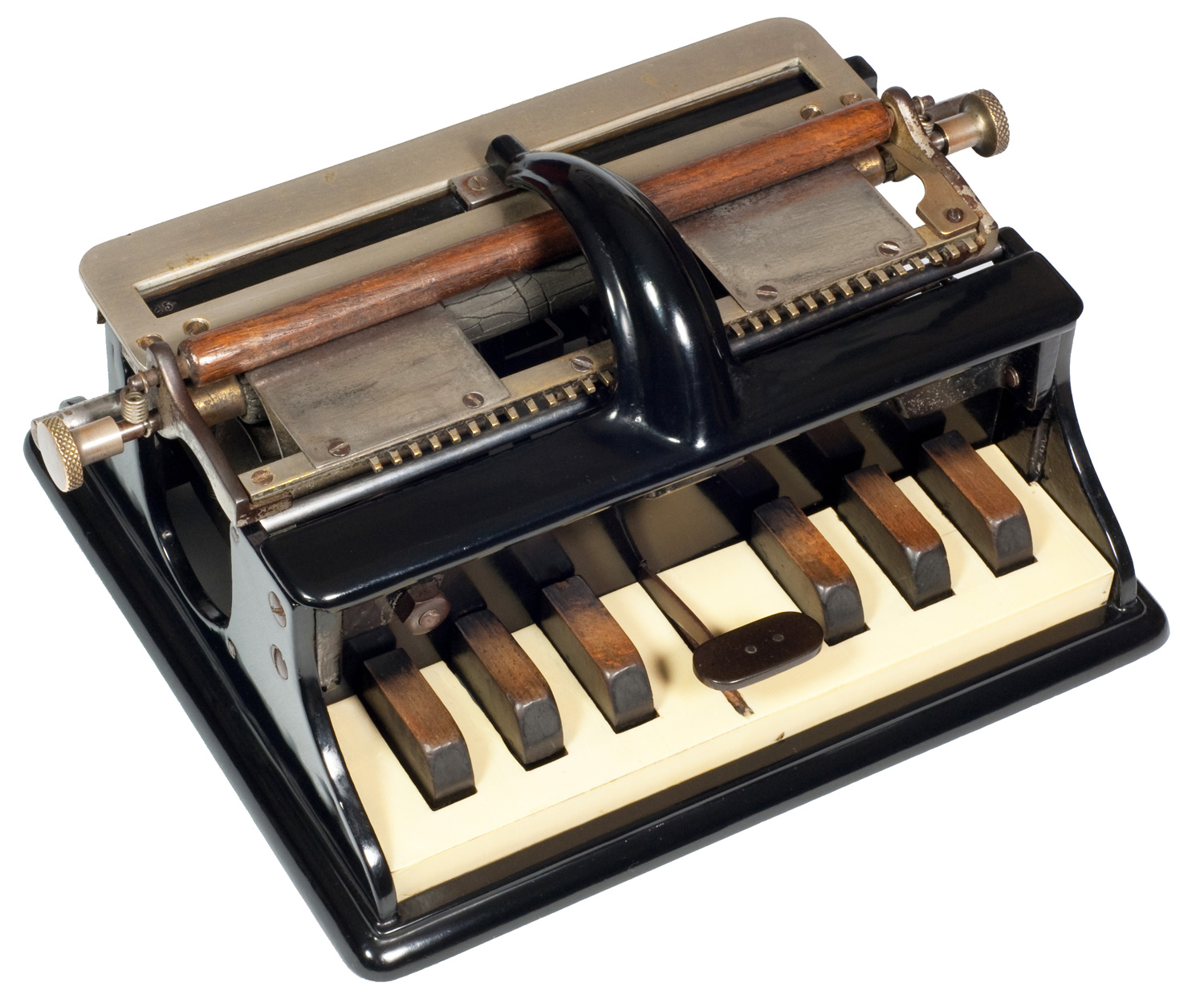
Hall-Braille writer, model 1, 1892

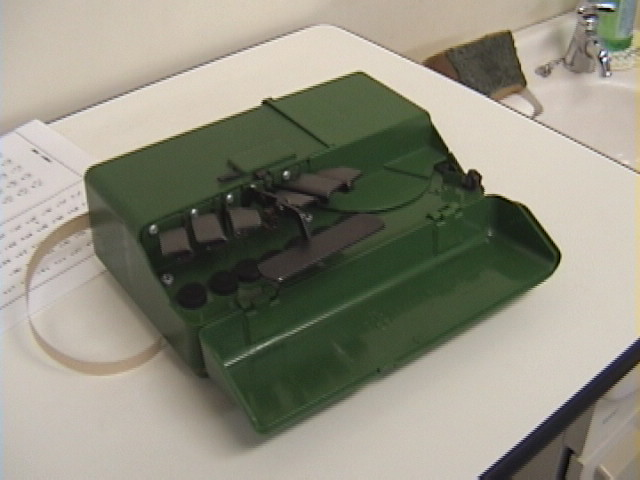
A braille keyboard

Braille (a writing system for the blind) uses either 6 or 8 tactile 'points' from which all letters and numbers are formed. When Louis Braille invented it, it was produced by pressing holes into paper using an awl. In 1892, Frank Haven Hall, superintendent of the Illinois Institute for the Education of the Blind, created the Hall Braille Writer, which was like a typewriter with 6 keys, one for each dot in a braille cell. The Perkins Brailler, first manufactured in 1951, uses a 6-key chord keyboard (plus a spacebar) to produce braille output, and has been very successful as a mass market affordable product. Braille, like Baudot, uses a number symbol and a shift symbol, which may be repeated for shift lock, to fit numbers and upper case into the 63 codes that 6 bits offer.

After World War II, with the arrival of electronics for reading chords and looking in tables of "codes", the postal sorting offices started to research chordic solutions to be able to employ people other than trained and expensive typists. In 1954, an important concept was discovered: chordic production is easier to master when the production is done at the release of the keys instead of when they are pressed.

Researchers at IBM investigated chord keyboards for both typewriters and computer data entry as early as 1959, with the idea that it might be faster than touch-typing if some chords were used to enter whole words or parts of words. A 1975 design by IBM Fellow Nat Rochester had 14 keys that were dimpled on the edges as well as the top, so one finger could press two adjacent keys for additional combinations. Their results were inconclusive, but research continued until at least 1978.

Doug Engelbart began experimenting with keysets to use with the mouse in the mid-1960s. In a famous 1968 demonstration, Engelbart introduced a computer–human interface that included the QWERTY keyboard, a three-button mouse, and a five-key keyset. Engelbart used the keyset with his left hand and the mouse with his right to type text and enter commands. The mouse buttons marked selections and confirmed or aborted commands.

Users in Engelbart's Augmentation Research Center at SRI became proficient with the mouse and keyset. In the 1970s the funding Engelbart's group received from the Advanced Research Projects Agency (ARPA) was cut and many key members of Engelbart's team went to work for Xerox PARC where they continued to experiment with the mouse and keyset. Keychord sets were used at Xerox PARC in the early 1980s, along with mice, GUIs, on the Xerox Star and Alto workstations. A one-button version of the mouse was incorporated into the Apple Macintosh but Steve Jobs decided against incorporating the chorded keyset.

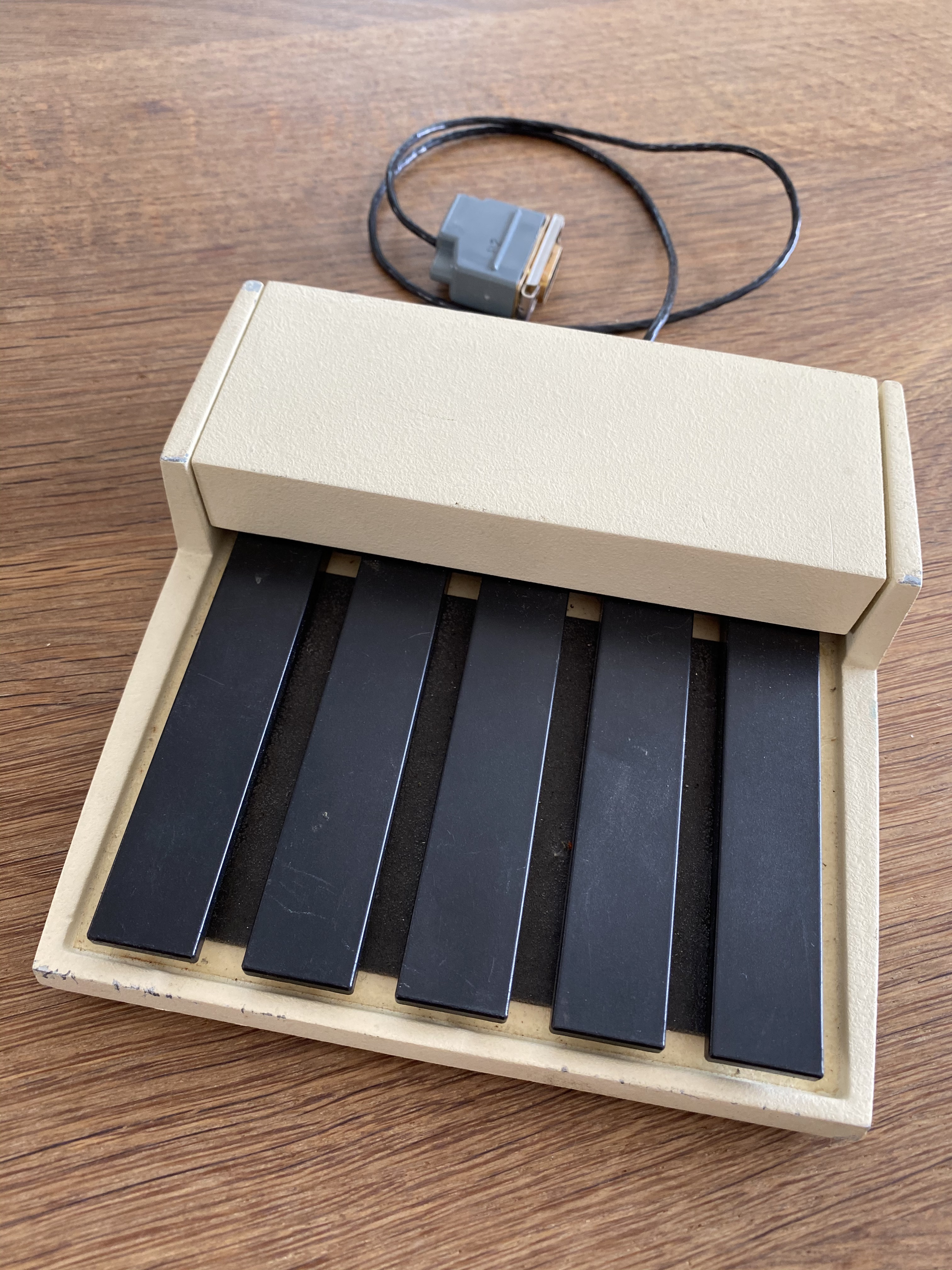
Xerox Alto keyset, ca. 1973.

In the early 1980s, Philips Research labs at Redhill, Surrey did a brief study into small, cheap keyboards for entering text on a telephone. One solution used a grid of hexagonal keys with symbols inscribed into dimples in the keys that were either in the center of a key, across the boundary of two keys, or at the joining of three keys. Pressing down on one of the dimples would cause either one, two or three of the hexagonal buttons to be depressed at the same time, forming a chord that would be unique to that symbol. With this arrangement, a nine button keyboard with three rows of three hexagonal buttons could be fitted onto a telephone and could produce up to 33 different symbols. By choosing widely separated keys, one could employ one dimple as a 'shift' key to allow both letters and numbers to be produced. With eleven keys in a 3/4/4 arrangement, 43 symbols could be arranged allowing for lowercase text, numbers and a modest number of punctuation symbols to be represented along with a 'shift' function for accessing uppercase letters. While this had the advantage of being usable by untrained users via 'hunt and peck' typing and requiring one less key switch than a conventional 12-button keypad, it had the disadvantage that some symbols required three times as much force to depress them as others which made it hard to achieve any speed with the device. That solution is still alive and proposed by Fastap and Unitap among others, and a commercial phone has been produced and promoted in Canada during 2006.

== Standards ==
Historically, the baudot and braille keyboards were standardized to some extent, but they are unable to replicate the full character set of a modern keyboard. Braille comes closest, as it has been extended to eight bits.

The only proposed modern standard, GKOS (or Global Keyboard Open Standard) can support most characters and functions found on a computer keyboard but has had little commercial development. There is, however, a GKOS keyboard application available for iPhone since May 8, 2010, for Android since October 3, 2010 and for MeeGo Harmattan since October 27, 2011.

== Stenography ==
Stenotype machines, sometimes used by court reporters, use a chording keyboard to represent sounds: on the standard keyboard, the U represents the sound and word, "you", and the three-key trigraph KAT represents the sound and word "cat". The stenotype keyboard is explicitly ordered: in KAT, K, on the left, is the starting sound. P, S, and T, which are common starting sounds and also common ending sounds, are available on both sides of the keyboard: POP is a 3-key chord, using both P keys.

== Open-source designs ==
A 104-key USB keyboard adapted into a chording keyboard. All phonetic keystrokes may be accomplished by one and two-key chords of the home keys on the top row.

Multiple open-source keyer/keyset designs are available, such as the pickey, a PS/2 device based on the PIC microcontroller; the spiffchorder, a USB device based on the Atmel AVR family of microcontrollers; the FeatherChorder, a BLE chorder based on the Adafruit Feather, an all-in-one board incorporating an Arduino-compatible microcontroller; and the GKOS keypad driver for Linux as well as the Gkos library for the Atmel/Arduino open-source board.

Plover is a free, open-source, cross-platform program intended to bring real-time stenographic technology not just to stenographers, but also to hobbyists using anything from professional Stenotype machines to low-cost NKRO gaming keyboards. It is available for Linux, Windows, and macOS.

Joy2chord is a chorded keyboard driver for Linux. With a configuration file, any joystick or gamepad can be turned into a chorded keyboard. This design philosophy was decided on to lower the cost of building devices, and in turn lower the entry barrier to becoming familiar with chorded keyboards. Macro keys, and multiple modes are also easily implemented with a user space driver.

== Commercial devices ==
One minimal chordic keyboard example is Edgar Matias's Half-Qwerty keyboard described in patent US 5288158 circa 1992 that produces the letters of the missing half when the user simultaneously presses the space bar along with the mirror key. INTERCHI '93 published a study by Matias, MacKenzie and Buxton showing that people who have already learned to touch-type can quickly recover 50 to 70% of their two-handed typing speed. The loss contributes to the speed discussion above. It is implemented on two popular mobile phones, each provided with software disambiguation, which allows users to avoid using the space-bar.

"Multiambic" keyers for use with wearable computers were invented in Canada in the 1970s. Multiambic keyers are similar to chording keyboards but without the board, in that the keys are grouped in a cluster for being handheld, rather than for sitting on a flat surface.

Chording keyboards are also used as portable but two handed input devices for the visually impaired (either combined with a refreshable braille display or vocal synthesis). Such keyboards use a minimum of seven keys, where each key corresponds to an individual braille point, except one key which is used as a spacebar. In some applications, the spacebar is used to produce additional chords which enable the user to issue editing commands, such as moving the cursor, or deleting words. Note that the number of points used in braille computing is not 6, but 8, as this allows the user, among other things, to distinguish between small and capital letters, as well as identify the position of the cursor. As a result, most newer chorded keyboards for braille input include at least nine keys.

Touch screen chordic keyboards are available to smartphone users as an optional way of entering text. As the number of keys is low, the button areas can be made bigger and easier to hit on the small screen. The most common letters do not necessarily require chording as is the case with the GKOS keyboard optimised layouts (Android app) where the twelve most frequent characters only require single keys.

The DecaTxt one-handed Bluetooth Chord keyboard, by IN10DID, Inc. has ten keys, two at each finger and is able to replace all standard keystrokes with chords of four keys or less. It is small at 3.25"x 2.25" and weighs about 2 ounces, making it quite wearable strapped to either hand for use while walking. DecaTxt is generally considered as assistive technology since it works with a variety of issues such as limited vision, limb loss, shaking and poor motor skills.

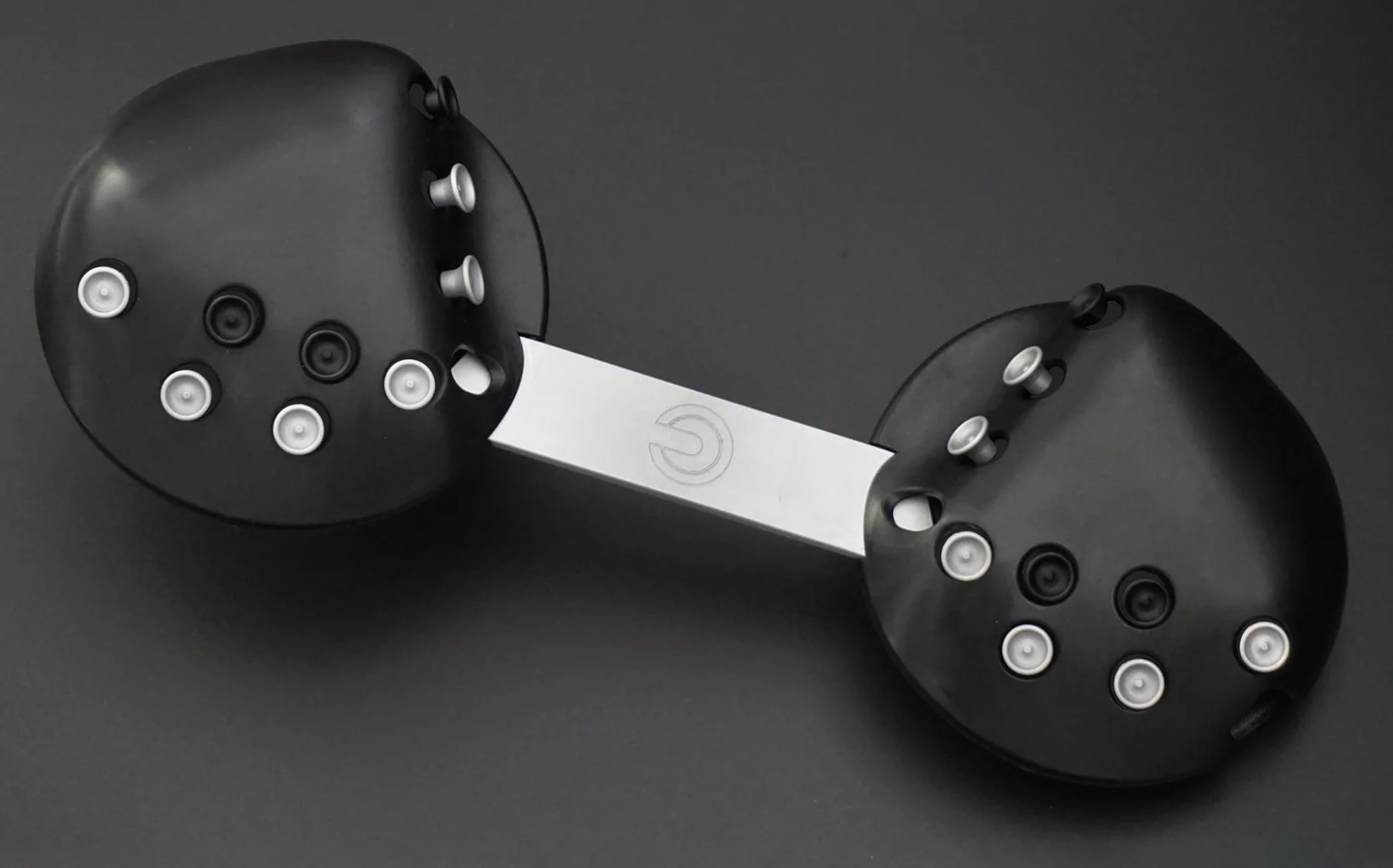
The CharaChorder One Keyboard

The company CharaChorder commercially sells chorded entry devices. Their first commercially available device is the CharaChorder One, which features a split design with each having access to 9 switches that can be moved in five directions (up, down, left, right, and pressed) in contrast to typical keyboards. This device allows for both chorded entry as well as traditional character entry. The set of words that can be chorded can be dynamically changed by the user in real time, but by default includes the 300 most common words in the English language. This chorded entry feature allows for potentially extremely fast typing speeds, so much so the founder of the company has been banned from online typing competitions. Additionally, they create the Charachorder Lite with a more traditional keyboard design. The manufacturer claimed that users of the Charachorder One can reach speeds of 300 words per minute, while users of the Charachorder Lite can reach 250 words per minute.

=== Historical ===
The WriteHander, a 12-key chord keyboard from NewO Company, appeared in 1978 issues of ROM Magazine, an early microcomputer applications magazine.

Another early commercial model was the six-button Microwriter, designed by Cy Endfield and Chris Rainey, and first sold in 1980. Microwriting is the system of chord keying and is based on a set of mnemonics. It was designed only for right-handed use.

The BAT is a 7-key hand-sized device from Infogrip, and has been sold since 1985. It provides one key for each finger and three for the thumb. It is proposed for the hand which does not hold the mouse, in an exact continuation of Engelbart's vision.

== See also ==
- BAT keyboard
- FrogPad
- Keyer
- Microwriter
- Palantype
- Stenotype
- Velotype syllable-chord keyboard
