= Stenotype =

Specialized typewriter or chorded keyboard for recording in shorthand

Demonstration Marc Grandjean (1928)

A steno machine, stenotype machine, shorthand machine, stenograph or steno writer is a specialized chorded keyboard or typewriter used by stenographers for shorthand use. In order to pass the United States Registered Professional Reporter test, a trained court reporter or closed captioner must write speeds of approximately 180, 200, and 225 words per minute (wpm) at very high accuracy in the categories of literary, jury charge, and testimony, respectively. Some stenographers can reach up to 375 words per minute, according to the website of the California Official Court Reporters Association (COCRA).

The stenotype keyboard has far fewer keys than a conventional alphanumeric keyboard. Multiple keys are pressed simultaneously (known as "chording" or "stroking") to spell out whole syllables, words, and phrases with a single hand motion. This system makes realtime transcription practical for court reporting and live closed captioning. Because the keyboard does not contain all the letters of the English alphabet, letter combinations are substituted for the missing letters. There are several schools of thought on how to record various sounds, such as the StenEd, Phoenix, and Magnum Steno theories.

== History ==
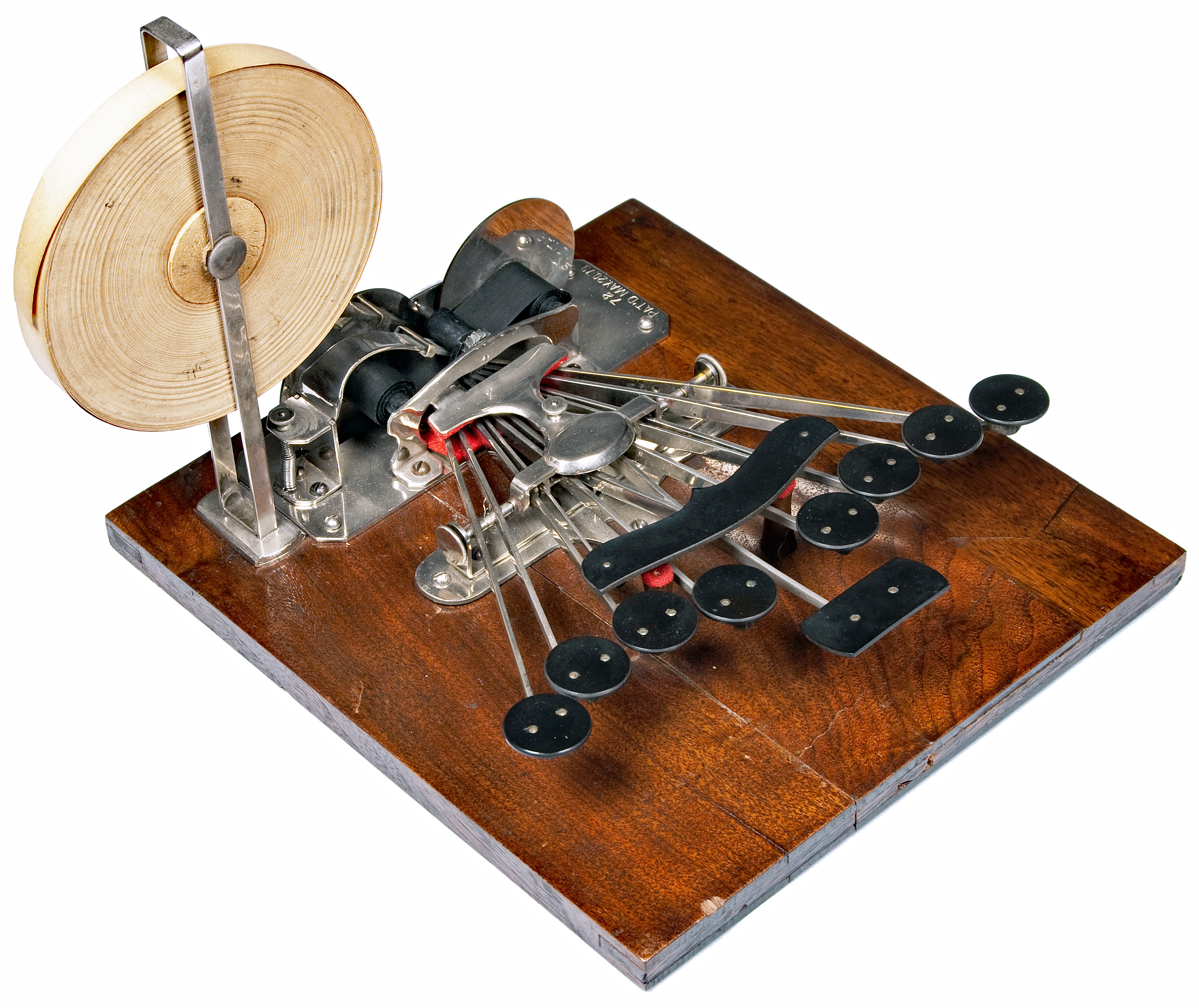
Stenograph - first model, Miles Bartholomew, 1879

The first shorthand machine (the word "stenotype" was not used for another 80 years or more) punched a paper strip and was built in 1830 by Karl Drais, a German inventor. The first machine was made in 1863 by the Italian Antonio Michela Zucco and was in actual use from 1880 in the Italian Senate. In New York City on December 24, 1875, John Celivergos Zachos invented a stenotype and filed patent number 175892 for type writers and phenotypic notation application. In 1879, Miles M. Bartholomew invented the shorthand machine. A French version was created by Marc Grandjean in 1909. The direct ancestor of today's stenotype was created by Ward Stone Ireland in about 1913, and the word "stenotype" was applied to his machine and its descendants sometime thereafter.

== Modern hardware ==
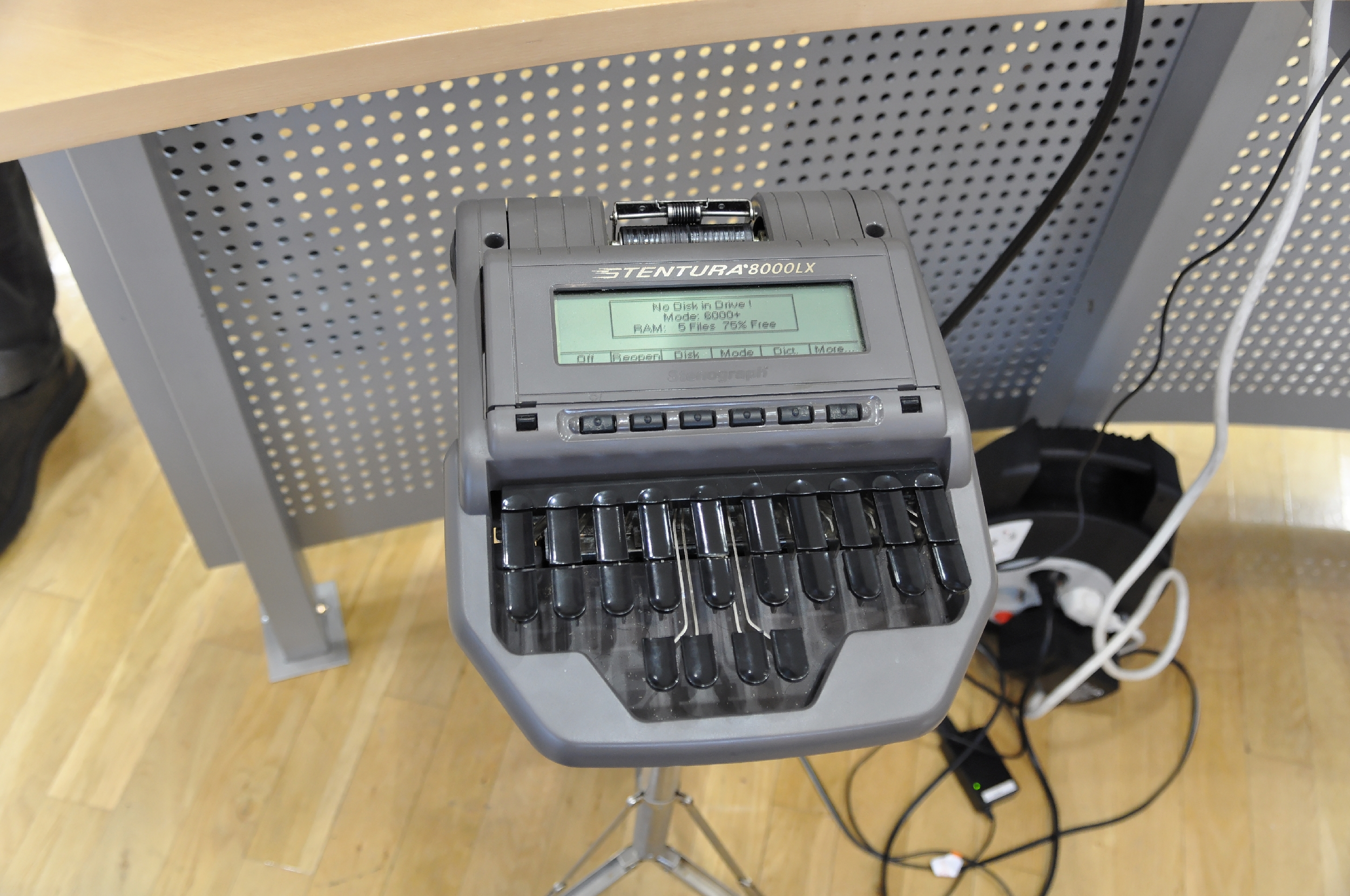
Stentura 8000LX steno writer

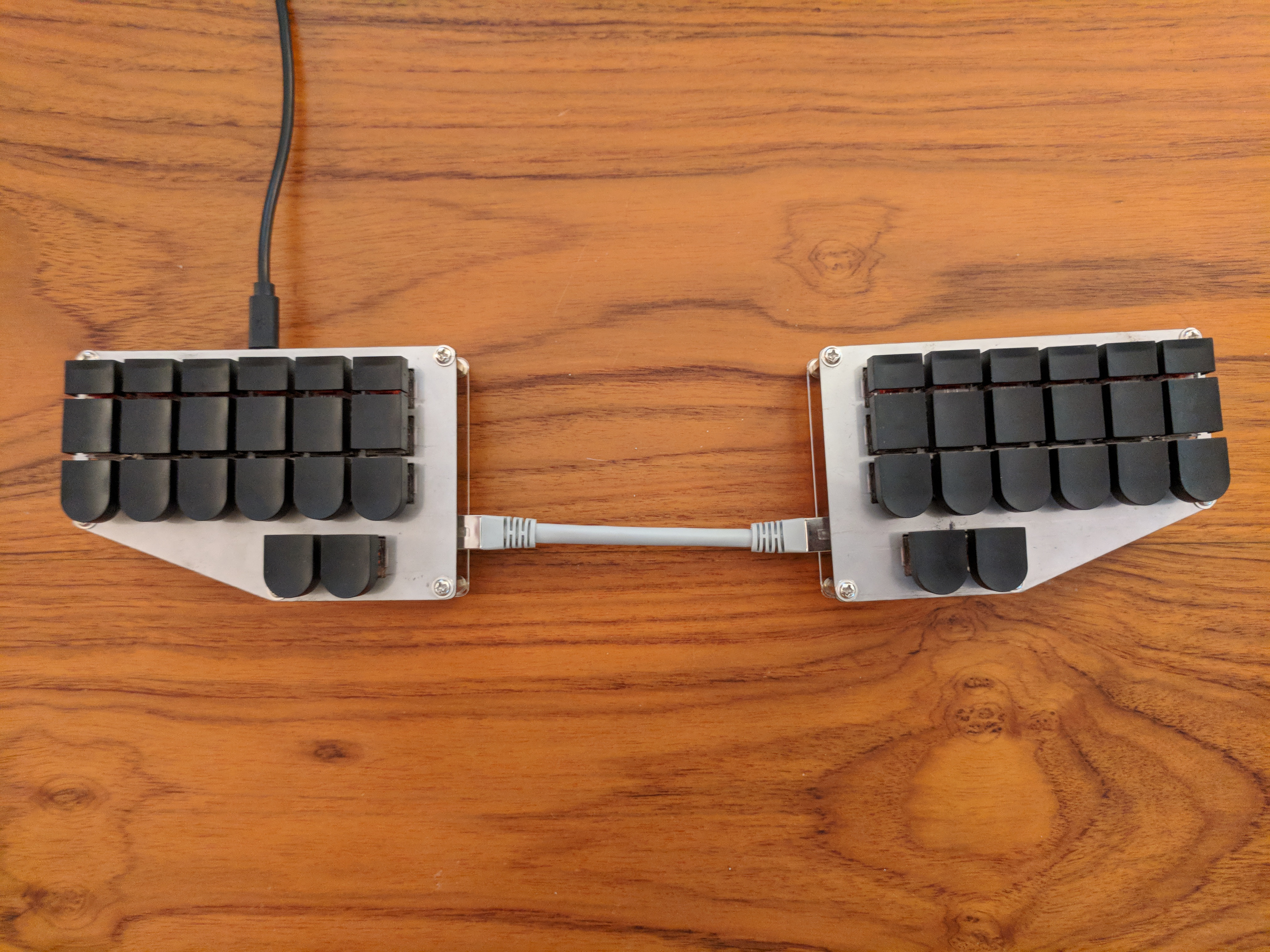
Open source stenotype hardware created by the SOFT/HRUF project

Most modern stenotype keyboards have more in common with computers than they do with typewriters or QWERTY computer keyboards. Most contain microprocessors, and many allow sensitivity adjustments for each individual key. They translate stenotype to the target language internally using user-specific dictionaries, and most have small display screens. They typically store a full day's work in non-volatile memory of some type, such as an SD card. These factors influence the price, along with economies of scale, as only a few thousand stenotype keyboards are sold each year. As of October 2013, student models, such as a Wave writer, sold for about US$1,500 and top-end models sold for approximately US$5,000. Machines that were 10 to 15 years old still resold for upward of $350.

The Open Steno Project has written free open-source software, including Plover, and has developed cheap open-source hardware for stenography. Plover software translates keypresses to Stenotype on any modern keyboard, with a preference given to ortholinear keyboards that have NKRO functionality.

=== Manufacturers ===
Stenograph is by far the largest manufacturer of American stenotype keyboards with an estimated market share in excess of 90%. Their top models are the NextGen and the Luminex CSE (Captioner Student Edition). There were two other large manufacturers in the 1980s (Xscribe, with the StenoRAM line and BaronData with the Transcriptor line). Stenograph purchased both companies and discontinued their products. The current manufacturers in the US include:

- Advantage Software (Passport and Passport Touch)
- Neutrino Group (Gemini, Revolution, & Infinity writers)
- ProCAT (Stenopaq, Flash, Stylus, Impression, and Xpression)
- Stenograph (Stentura, élan Mira, Fusion, élan Cybra, Wave, Diamante, Luminex, and NexGen)
- Stenovations (LightSpeed)
- Word Technologies (Tréal)

=== Hobbyist keyboards ===
Many steno enthusiasts are making and selling keyboards designed for use with Plover, the open source steno software. Most of these keyboards range from about $100 to $200 and allow the user to use stenography on their computer through Plover. Vendors include:

- g Heavy Industries (Georgi)
- Nolltronics (EcoSteno)
- SOFT/HRUF (Splitography)
- StenoKeyboards (The Uni)
- Stenomod (TinyMod)
- Stenography Store (Starboard)

== Keyboard layout ==
A stenotype machine keyboard layout.

Stenotype keys normally are made of a hard, high-luster acrylic material with no markings. The accompanying image shows the keyboard layout of the American stenotype machine.

In "home position", the fingers of the left hand rest along the gap between the two main rows of keys to the left of the asterisk (little finger on the "S" to forefinger on the "H" and "R"). These fingers are used to generate initial consonants. The fingers of the right hand lie in the corresponding position to the right of the asterisk (forefinger on "FR" to little finger on "TS"), and are used for final consonants. The thumbs produce the vowels.

The system is roughly phonetic; for example the word cat would be written by a single stroke expressing the initial K, the vowel A, and the final T.

To enter a number, a user presses the number bar at the top of the keyboard at the same time as the other keys, much like the Shift key on a QWERTY-based keyboard. The illustration shows which lettered keys correspond to which digits. Numbers can be chorded, just as letters can. They read from left to right across the keyboard. It is possible to write 137 in one stroke by pressing the number bar along with SP P, but it takes three separate strokes to write 731. Many court reporters and stenocaptioners write out numbers phonetically instead of using the number bar.

There are various rule sets, known as theories, to combine letters to make different sounds; different court reporters use different theories in their work. Historically, reporters often created "briefs" (abbreviations) on-the-fly, and sometimes mixed theories, which could make it difficult for one reporter to read another reporter's notes, but current versions of theories are primarily designed for computerized translation using a standardized dictionary provided by the company that promulgates the theory, which forces reporters to stick with one theory and use only the specific combinations in that company's dictionary. However, it is not uncommon for students and reporters to add a significant number of entries to a stock dictionary, usually when creating briefs of their own.

Some court reporters use scopists to translate and edit their work. A scopist is a person who is trained in the phonetic writing system, English punctuation, and usually in legal formatting. They are especially helpful when court reporters are working so much that they do not have time to edit their own work. Both scopists and proofreaders work closely with court reporters to ensure an accurate transcript. The widespread use of realtime translation of the strokes has increased the demand for scopists to work simultaneously with the court reporter. With transcripts produced on computer-aided transcription (CAT) software, a scopist no longer needs to have any knowledge of shorthand theories, because the software converts shorthand to text in real time via a dictionary. However, it may still be helpful in some situations while scoping, as misstroked words may not translate and would appear in steno. Depending on availability of scopists and proofreaders, court reporters may use a scopist only to clean up a rough draft of their transcript, then proofread and certify the transcript themselves, or they may use neither and produce a final transcript by themselves, though this is a very time-consuming practice.

=== Steno paper ===
Steno paper has become almost obsolete with the advancement in paperless stenotype machines. When it is used, steno paper comes out of a stenotype machine at the rate of one row per chord, with the pressed letters printed out in 22 columns corresponding to the 22 keys, in the following order:

STKPWHRAO*EUFRPBLGTSDZ

=== Chords ===
This is a basic chart of the letters of this machine. There are, however, different writing theories that represent some letters or sounds differently (e.g., the *F for final v in the chart below), and each court reporter develops personalized "briefs" and codes.

Stenotype chords
English letter		Stenotype chord STKPWHRAO*EUFRPBLGTSDZ	Example	Comments
Initial consonants	b	PW	bet (PWET)	
Initial consonants	c (soft)	K R	cell (KREL)	Use for soft c only
Initial consonants	ch	K H	chat (KHAT)	
Initial consonants	d	TK	dug (TKUG)	
Initial consonants	f	T P	for (TPOR)	
Initial consonants	g	TKPW	get (TKPWET)	
Initial consonants	h	H	hat (HAT)	
Initial consonants	j	S K W R	jet (SKWRET)	
Initial consonants	k	K	call (KAUL)	Includes hard c
Initial consonants	l	HR	let (HRET)	
Initial consonants	m	P H	met (PHET)	
Initial consonants	n	T P H	net (TPHET)	
Initial consonants	p	P	pet (PET)	
Initial consonants	qu	K W	quit (KWEUT)	
Initial consonants	r	R	rat (RAT)	
Initial consonants	s	S	set (SET)	
Initial consonants	sh	S H	shut (SHUT)	
Initial consonants	t	T	top (TOP)	
Initial consonants	th	T H	that (THAT)	
Initial consonants	v	S R	vet (SRET)	
Initial consonants	w	W	wet (WET)	
Initial consonants	y	K W R	yet (KWRET)	
Initial consonants	z	S *	zap (S*AP)	alternatively, commonly chorded by the entire initial bank, STKPWHR, in order to avoid thousands of potential conflicts
Vowels	Short a /æ/	A	pat (PAT)	
Vowels	Long a /eɪ/	A EU	pair (PAEUR)	
Vowels	aw /ɔː/ /ɑː/	A U	wall (WAUL)	
Vowels	Short e /ɛ/	E	said (SED)	
Vowels	Long e /iː/	AO E	seed (SAOED)	
Vowels	Short i /ɪ/	EU	kit (KEUT)	
Vowels	Long i /aɪ/	AO EU	kite (KAOEUT)	
Vowels	Short o /ɒ/	O	offer (OFR)	
Vowels	Long o /oʊ/	O E	over (OEFR)	
Vowels	oi /ɔɪ/	O EU	soil (SOEUL)	
Vowels	oo /ʊ/ /uː/	AO	hood (HAOD)	only used for words spelled with oo also used for words spelled with oa to disambiguate certain homophones, like road (RAOD) vs. rode (ROED)
Vowels	ou /aʊ/	O U	howl (HOUL)	
Vowels	Short u /ʌ/ /ə/	U	cut (KUT)	
Vowels	Long u /juː/	AO U	cute (KAOUT)	also used for words with /uː/ that are not spelled with oo like crew (KRAOU)
Vowels	See note	A E	pear (PAER)	used for words spelled with ea or a…e to disambiguate certain homophones
Final consonants	b	B	lab (HRAB)	
Final consonants	ch	F P	latch (HRAFP)	
Final consonants	d	D	lad (HRAD)	
Final consonants	dz	DZ	friends (TPREPBDZ)	use only for words that end with ds
Final consonants	f	F	laugh (HRAF)	
Final consonants	g	G	lag (HRAG)	
Final consonants	j	PBLG	ledge (HREPBLG)	
Final consonants	k	B G	lack (HRABG)	
Final consonants	l	L	lull (HRUL)	
Final consonants	m	P L	lamb (HRAPL)	also used for lm like calm (KAUPL)
Final consonants	mp	FRP	lamp (HRAFRP)	
Final consonants	n	PB	lain (HRAEUPB)	
Final consonants	nch	FRPBLG	lunch (HRUFRPBLG)	
Final consonants	ng	PB G	long (HROPBG)	
Final consonants	nj	PB G	range (RAEUPBG)	
Final consonants	nk	* PB G	link (HR*EUPBG)	
Final consonants	p	P	lap (HRAP)	
Final consonants	r	R	liar (HRAOEUR)	
Final consonants	rch	FRPB	lurch (HRUFRPB)	
Final consonants	rf	FR B	surf (SUFRB)	
Final consonants	rv	FR B	curve (KUFRB)	
Final consonants	s	S	lass (HRAS)	
Final consonants	sh	R B	lash (HRAFRB)	
Final consonants	sm	F P L	chasm (KHAFPL)	
Final consonants	st	F T	last (HRAFT)	*S may be used when in conflict with ft, like lost (HRO*S)
Final consonants	t	T	let (HRET)	
Final consonants	th	* T	lathe (HRA*EUT)	
Final consonants	v	* F	leave (HRAO*EF)	
Final consonants	x	B G S	lax (HRABGS)	
Final consonants	z	Z	craze (KRAEUZ)	
Final consonants	ing	G	laughing (HRAFG)	
Final consonants	shun	G S	nation (TPHA*EUGS)	
Final consonants	kshun	* B G S	action (A*BGS)	
Punctuation	Period	F P L T		
Punctuation	Comma	R B G S		
Punctuation	Question mark	ST P H		
Punctuation	New paragraph	P F		
Punctuation	Correction (asterisk)	*		

== Example ==
The following example shows how steno paper coming out of the machine represents an English sentence. Notice that key combinations can have different meanings depending on context. In the first stroke of the word example, the PL combination refers to m. In the second stroke of the word, that same key combination refers to the two letters pl.

English text rendered in steno shorthand

Many words have been abbreviated: this, of and from are chorded as th, f and fr, and machine and shorthand become mn and shand respectively.

== Canada ==
There is one NCRA-approved school in all of Canada that teaches stenotype: the captioning and court reporting program at NAIT (Northern Alberta Institute of Technology). This program uses the STKPWHRAO*EUFRPBLGTSDZ keyboard layout. Graduates are trained to be court reporters, broadcast captioners, or CART providers and report a median income of $70,000 CAD between 2017 and 2020. NAIT paused the program in September 2025, citing low enrollment. Some students from the 2024 cohort are reporting they cannot find work in their field, and students partway through the program are asking for tuition refunds.

== Other systems ==
=== English ===
In addition to the above American Stenotype layout of STKPWHRAO*EUFRPBLGTSDZ used internationally (Ward Stone Ireland 1913), there is also a Possum Palantype system still being used in the UK.

=== Italian ===
Two Stenotype layouts are in use for the Italian language: Michela and Melani. The former is in use by the Italian senate.

=== Korean ===
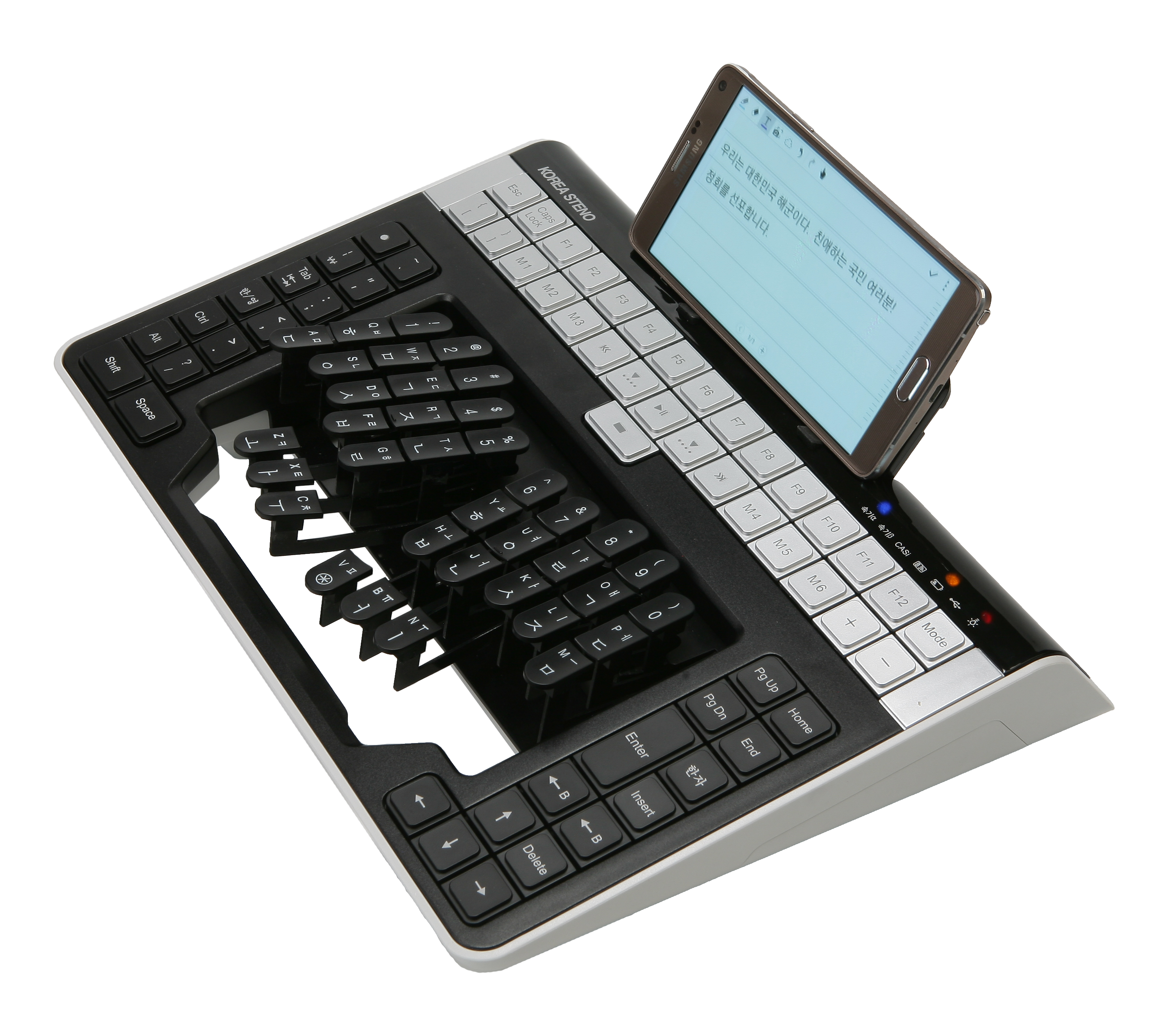
A Korean stenotype of the CAS layout.

The main stenotype systems in Korea are CAS and Sorizava.

=== Other languages ===
- The Portuguese language has two stenotype systems. The Brazilian system uses the same layout as the American English one.
- The Japanese language uses a StenoWord system with ten remapped keys or a more conventional Sokutaipu system.
- As with the Korean language, Chinese stenotype layouts depend on the manufacturer, four of which are most commonly encountered in the market. A combination of chording and abbreviation is used.

== See also ==
- Captioned telephone
- Chorded keyboard
- Closed captioning
- Court reporting
- Remote CART
- Shorthand
- Velotype
