= National Court Reporters Association =

American organization

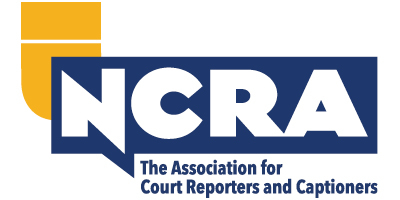
- Abbreviation: NCRA
- Formation: 1899
- Founded at: Chicago, IL
- Type: Non-profit
- Purpose: Promote excellence among those who capture and convert the spoken word to text.
- Headquarters: Reston, VA
- Members: 12,000
- President: Keith R. Lemons, FAPR, RPR, CRR (Ret.)
- Executive Director: Dave Wenhold, CAE, PLC
- Affiliations: NCRA PAC, National Court Reporters Foundation
- Staff: 27
- Website: ncra.org
- Formerly called: National Shorthand Reporters Association

The National Court Reporters Association (NCRA) is an American organization for the advancement of the court reporter, closed captioner, and real-time writer. The association holds annual conventions, seminars and forums, speed and real-time contests, and teachers' workshops to assist court reporters.

Reporters can join NCRA for a fee that varies depending on whether the applicant is a student, teacher, or reporter. Membership allows a reporter to take the certifications, get discounts on conventions, attend conferences, and have access to a network of other professionals in the field.

Cindy L. Isaacsen is NCRA President for the 2025-2026 term.

== History ==
NCRA was established in 1899 in Chicago, Illinois, United States as the National Shorthand Reporters Association (NSRA). The organization was renamed the National Court Reporters Association in 1990. They standardized ethical codes, transcript rates, and information for all shorthand reporters. They published "The Shorthand Writer" and started the National Speed Contest, which is still held today. NCRA developed the first standardized test for court reporters to gauge their proficiency. Called the Certificate of Proficiency, it was replaced by the Registered Professional Reporter.

== Membership ==
NCRA supports individuals through education and certification, promotion of the stenographic profession throughout the legal industry, and defense of the industry in government. NCRA provides news and information to its members through email newsletters and its JCR magazine, as well as on its website.

== NCRA Certifications ==
One of NCRA's primary objectives is to set national certification standards and assist states seeking to establish certification or licensing requirements. To that end, NCRA has administered its nationally recognized certification program for court reporters since 1937. In addition, many states currently accept or use the RPR in the place of the state certification or licensing exam.

== NCRA-approved court reporting programs ==
The court reporter programs offered at the following institutions have met the General Requirements and Minimum Standards established by the Council on Approved Student Education] (CASE) of the National Court Reporters Association, earning the right to describe themselves as NCRA-approved. In order to achieve and maintain certification, these programs agree to periodic review by CASE to verify their continued adherence to the GRMS. All NCRA-approved court reporting programs are accredited by agencies recognized by the U.S. Department of Education.

Alabama

- Gadsden State Community College

California

- South Coast College

Florida

- Atlantic Technical College

Illinois

- Generations College (formerly MacCormac College)
- South Suburban College

Iowa

- Des Moines Area Community College

Michigan

- Macomb Community College

Minnesota

- Anoka Technical College

New York

- Alfred State College
- Plaza College

Ohio

- Clark State College
- Cuyahoga Community College
- Stark State College

Pennsylvania

- Community College of Allegheny County

Texas

- San Antonio College

Washington

- Green River College

Wisconsin

- Lakeshore Technical College

Canada

- Northern Alberta Institute of Technology
