= Half-keyboard =

Specialty keyboard

A half-keyboard is a specially designed and programmed keyboard used in limited space situations or when the typist needs a hand free to answer the phone, hold documents, etc.

The "Half-QWERTY" keyboard, invented by Edgar Matias, consists of only the left-hand half of a normal QWERTY keyboard, but when the space bar is held down, it switches to the right half of the keyboard, allowing a person to type with only one hand.

It is said to be quick to learn because human bodies can easily replicate one motion on one side to the other side, and almost as fast as a normal keyboard.

Also a standard keyboard can be used with special keyboard driver software as a half-keyboard for temporary or testing use, as the physical layout does not differ.
