= Velotype =

Chorded keyboard design

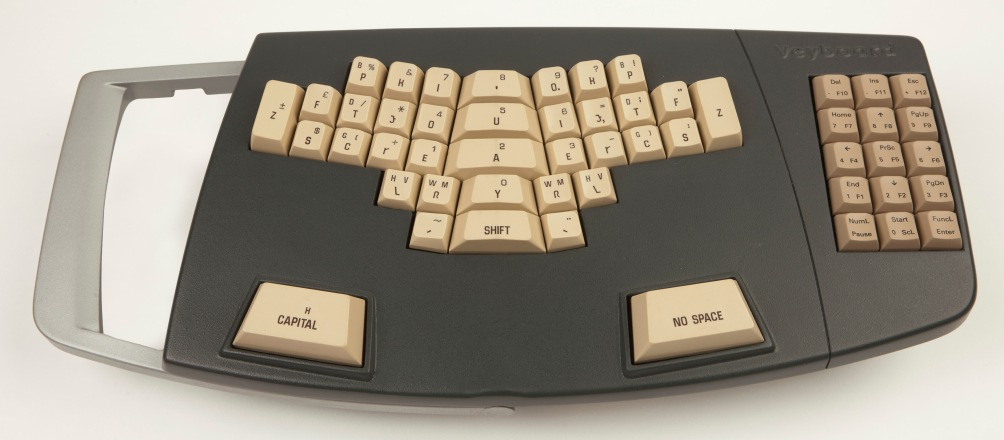
Velotype keyboard

Velotype is the trademark for a type of keyboard for typing text known as a syllabic chord keyboard, an invention of the Dutchmen Nico Berkelmans and Marius den Outer.

== History ==
Marius den Outer invented the Tachotype in 1933. Herman Schweigman and Rudolf Nitzsche created an electronic version of the Tachotype in 1982 and named it the Velotype. A stand-alone Velotype text processor was created in 2001 named the Veyboard.

In 2011 the Velotype keyboard was improved and modernized by Wim Gerbecks and Sander Pasveer. Velotype is a Dutch company.

== Design and rationale ==
Contrary to traditional QWERTY type keyboards, on which a typist usually presses one key at a time to create one character at a time, a Velotype requires the user to press several keys simultaneously, producing syllables rather than letters.

A practiced velotypist can produce more text than on a traditional keyboard, as much as 200 words per minute, double the rate of a fast traditional typist. Because of this, Velotypes are often used for live applications, such as subtitling for television and for the hearing impaired.

The keyboard is an orthographic chord keyboard, very different from phonetic chord keyboards designed for verbatim transcription, like the stenotype. Such chorded phonetic keyboards, such as those manufactured by Stenograph, produce an intermediate shorthand format in which a combination of phonetics- and spelling-based strokes are translated by software to produce the output. Orthographic keyboards, on the other hand, allow the operator to rely on more traditional spelling in shaping the output, hence the term "orthographic" as opposed to "phonetic".

The Velotype-pro contains software that allows the user to create their own abbreviations and short forms in addition to those pre-built into the machine.

Stenographic keyboards are generally more difficult to learn than the Velotype, but trained stenotype operators can go faster, even upwards of 300 words per minute. However, if unusual words appear, a typist using a stenotype slows down, while the Velotypist can continue with the same speed, which can go up to 200 words per minute.

== See also ==
- Chorded keyboard
- Stenotype
- Dvorak keyboard layout
