= Voice writing =

Real-time transcription method

Voice writing is a transcription method used for court reporting, medical transcription, CART, and closed captioning. Using voice writing, a court reporter speaks directly into a stenomask or speech silencer, a hand-held mask containing one or two microphones, and voice-dampening materials. As the reporter repeats the testimony into the recorder, the mask prevents the reporter from being heard during the testimony.

== Purpose and function ==
Voice writers can be used to record speeches by judges, witnesses, attorneys, and other parties to a proceeding, including gestures and emotional reactions, and either provide a real-time feed or prepare transcripts afterward.

In medical transcription, some transcriptionists use voice writing instead of typing. They receive audio files and use a voice recognition program to translate voice to text.

== Method ==
The method of court reporting known as voice writing, formerly called "stenomask," was developed by Horace Webb in the World War II era. Before inventing voice writing, Webb was a Gregg shorthand writer. Court reporting using Gregg shorthand is a multi-level process in which the reporter records the proceedings using shorthand and then dictates from his notes into a tape recorder. After the testimony is transferred to audio tape, a transcriptionist types out official documentation of the proceedings.

A voice writing system consists of a stenomask, an external sound digitizer, and speech recognition software. A foot pedal can plug into a computer's USB port. A real-time voice writer's words go through the mask's cable to an external USB digital signal processor. From there, the words go into the computer's speech recognition engine for conversion into streaming text. Voice writers write repeated words stated by the parties to a proceeding (verbatim transcription). They punctuate the text and, in some cases, mark exhibits.

Voice writers produce the same products as using stenotypes, including transcripts in electronic and printed formats. Real-time reporters connect their laptops to captioning equipment and real-time viewer programs and provide attorneys or other clients with computer files at the end of the sessions. Speech recognition CAT systems affords a download in ASCII format for distribution immediately following a proceeding.
