= Transcript (law) =

Written record of spoken language, especially in the context of court proceedings

A transcript is a written record of spoken language. In court proceedings, a transcript is usually a record of all decisions of the judge, and the spoken arguments by the litigants' lawyers. A related term used in the United States is docket, not a full transcript.

A transcript is expected to be an exact and unedited record of every spoken word, with each speaker indicated. Such a record was originally made by court stenographers who used a form of shorthand abbreviation to write as quickly as people spoke. Today, most court reporters use a specialized machine with a phonetic key system, typing a key or key combination for every sound a person utters.

Many courts worldwide have now begun to use digital recording systems. The recordings are archived and are sent to court reporters or transcribers only when a transcript is requested. Some court systems have also explored using artificial intelligence (AI) to produce court transcripts.

Transcripts may be available publicly or to a restricted group of persons; judges can restrict transcript access if a given transcript contains sensitive data.

== Types ==
A transcript is also any written record of a speech, debate or discussion.

Rush transcripts are transcript requests that can be processed and mailed, or picked up, within short time of the request (usually 24 hours or less), provided there are no extenuating circumstances (such as unpaid bills). These expedited transcripts normally cost more than regular transcripts.

== Check against delivery ==
Sometimes, the first page of a transcript will have the words "Check Against Delivery" stamped across it, which means that the transcript is not the legal representation of the speech, but rather only the audio delivery is regarded as the official record. This is better explained in the French version of the message – Seul le texte prononcé fait foi, literally "Only the spoken text is faithful".

Conversely, it may be that the actual given speech differs from the way the speaker intended, or that it contains extra information that is not pertinent to the central points of the speech and that the speaker does not want to be left as a permanent record.

== See also ==
- Rough ASCII
- Deposition (law)
- Discovery (law)
- Transcription (linguistics)
- Minutes
- Witness
