= Court reporter =

Person who records live court testimony

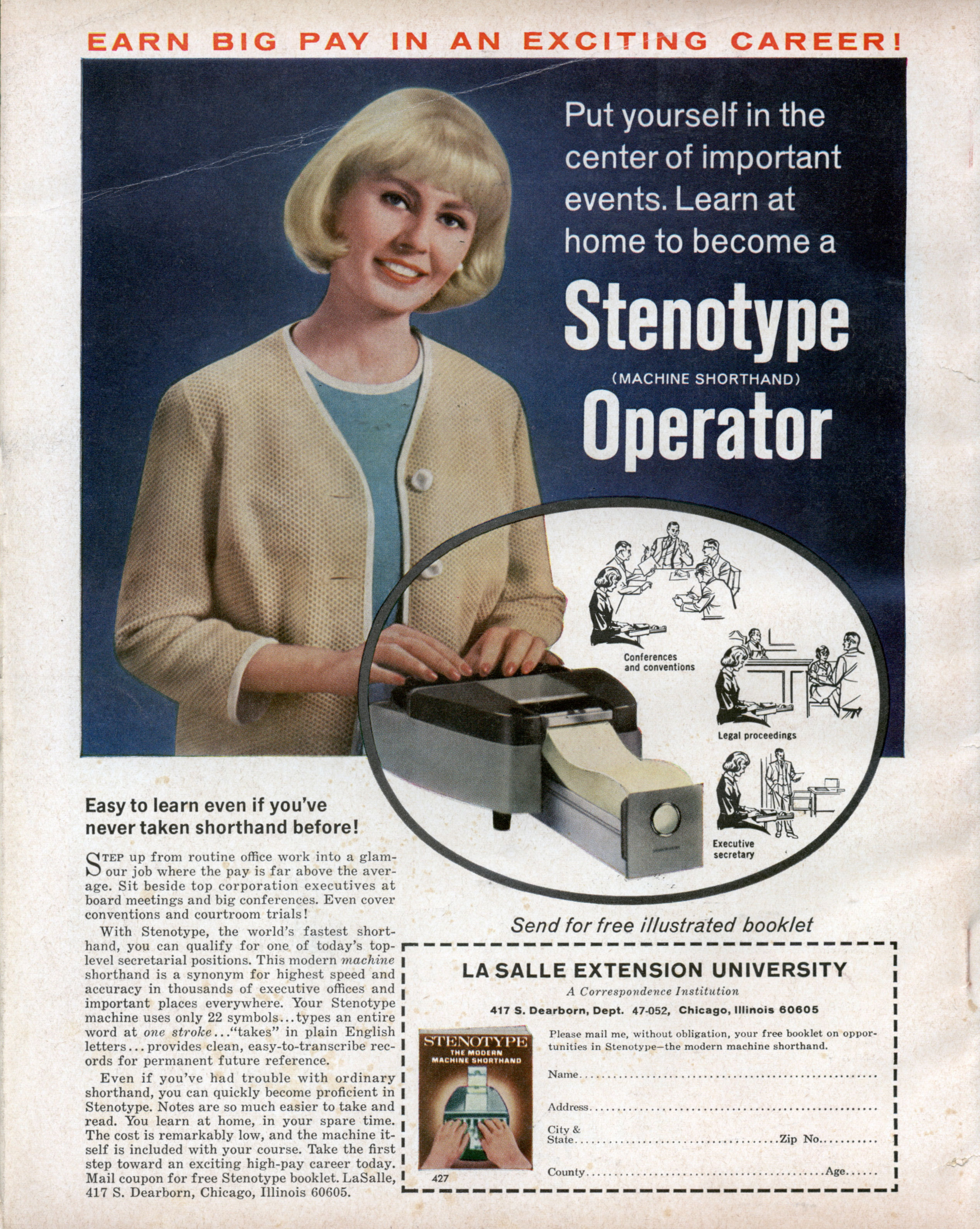
Historical 1965 ad of Stenotype Career

A court reporter, court stenographer, or shorthand reporter is a person whose occupation is to capture the live testimony in proceedings using a stenographic machine or a stenomask, thereby transforming the proceedings into an official certified transcript by nature of their training, certification, and usually licensure. This can include courtroom hearings and trials, depositions and discoveries, sworn statements, and more.

== United States ==
In certain states, a court reporter is a notary, by virtue of their state licensing, and a notary public is authorized to administer oaths to witnesses and certify that their transcript of the proceedings is a verbatim account of what was said—unlike a court recorder, whose job is to operate audio recording devices and send the recorded files for transcription over the internet. Many states require a court reporter to hold a certification obtained through the National Court Reporters Association, National Verbatim Reporters Association or The American Association of Electronic Reporters and Transcribers; still, others require their own state-specific licensing or certification.

=== Skills and training ===
It typically takes anywhere from two to four years to learn the basic skills to become a stenographic court reporter. Applicants first learn to use the steno keyboard (which takes the most time), and heavy academic training is also required. Candidates usually attend specialized certificate courses at private business schools or sometimes associate's or bachelor's degree programs at accredited colleges and universities. Distance learning and online training courses are also available. After additional on-the-job training and experience, many court reporters then move on to realtime reporting.

Required skills of a licensed stenographic court reporter are a command of the language being spoken, attention to detail, exceptional hearing, and the ability to focus for long periods at a time. Skilled court reporters can provide real-time transcription and have earning potential, with salaries up to six figures possible in some areas.

In 2004, Mark Kislingbury secured the title of fastest realtime court reporter through Guinness World Records by writing 360 words per minute on his stenographic machine.

=== Licensing ===
Most states require that court reporters obtain a license via examination before being allowed to practice in that respective state. Examinations include writing speed tests at 180 wpm, 200 wpm and 225 wpm, and a written examination to demonstrate proficiency in English, grammar, medical terminology, legal terminology, courtroom decorum, the Federal Rules of Civil Procedure Rule 30, court reporting procedure and ethics.

Licensed court reporters are required to attend yearly continuing education courses of at least 10 hours in order to maintain active licensure.

=== Court reporting professional associations and licensing entities ===
The National Court Reporters Association (NCRA) is a national stenographic court reporting association in the United States. Stenographers can also join the National Verbatim Reporters Association (NVRA), a professional organization dedicated to the practice of voice writing, which is another method used to take down court proceedings in certain states. For court recorders who also operate audio equipment, there is the American Association of Electronic Reporters and Transcribers (AAERT). Court reporters, voice writers, and transcribers must pass both a written and practical examination.

The NCRA offers the title Registered Professional Reporter (RPR) to those who pass a four-part examination, including a three-part skills exam and a written exam, and participate in continuing education programs. A court reporter may obtain additional prestigious certifications that demonstrate an even higher level of competency, such as Registered Merit Reporter (RMR), Certified Real-time Reporter (CRR), Certified Realtime Captioner (CRC), or Certificate of Merit (CM), Certified Broadcast Captioner (CBC), and Certified CART Provider (CCP).

The NVRA offers the title Certified Verbatim Reporter (CVR) to voice writers who pass a four-part examination, including both a skills and written exam, and participate in continuing education programs.

=== Non-stenographic certifications ===
The AAERT offers electronic reporters and transcribers three certifications: certified electronic reporter (CER), certified electronic transcriber (CET), and certified electronic reporter and transcriber (CERT) for setup and use of basic recording equipment. Transcription, however, is not performed by the court reporter in most cases. The International Alliance of Professional Reporters and Transcribers (IAPRT.org) is a member-based not-for-profit consortium engaged in the ongoing development of digital court recording and transcription, and guiding public and private court recording paraprofessionals worldwide toward the goal of producing as much of a verbatim and verifiable record as possible given the number of limits of even modern-day recording equipment.

=== Salary and job outlook ===
In the United States, the Bureau of Labor Statistics continues to report a positive job outlook for stenographic court reporters. Median annual salary in 2022 was listed at $63,560 per year. The top 10 percent of court reporters earned more than $91,280. In May 2012, Forbes listed "stenographic court reporter" as one of the best jobs that does not require a four-year degree. As of 2015, the median annual salary for a court reporter was $50,000. The actual amount can vary depending on whether the court reporter works in an in-court capacity as an "official" reporter or as a reporter of pre-trial discovery (depositions). Additionally, pay can vary based on whether the original and/or a copy of the transcript is ordered by any of the parties to the action. The growth rate of the profession was projected to be 2% to 3%, which is lower than the average of 7%, but the demand has remained high due to a national rise in litigation overall. The "Ducker Report," commissioned by the National Court Reporters Association (NCRA) to assess the state of the profession, predicted the stenographic court reporters workforce would total approximately 27,700 in 2018. Contrary to these projections, the U.S. Bureau of Labor Statistics reports the actual number to be around 21,300 in 2022, indicating a faster-than-expected decline. This underscores a pivotal moment for the profession, exacerbated by reports from numerous state certification boards of a sustained decrease in court reporter applicants. In some states, this decrease is as stark as an 85% reduction over the last five years.

As of 2012, Maryland employed the most court reporters, while New York has the highest average salary. Some states have experienced budget cuts in recent years that have reduced the number of state-funded court reporters. This has resulted in law firms hiring stenographic court reporters directly, as they are independent contractors, to ensure proceedings are verbatim.

In England, as of 2023, the estimated yearly salary for a court reporter was in the range of £28,000-£35,000 (approx. US $35,000-$44,000). In 2014, the salary for freelance court reporters varied, with realtime reporters earning around £405.88 (approx. US $512.59) per day.

=== Work ===
A Certified Realtime Reporter (CRR) and a Certified Broadcast Captioner (CBC) offer the ability to show live transcription of the spoken record by captioning what is said to display it on a screen in real time, and as the latter is a stenographic court reporter, they can provide instant read back of testimony unlike a recording. Digital recordings often operated by court clerks or AAERT members are able to provide for instant playback or review of portions of the recording with the appropriate reporting software.

Many stenographic court reporters work as freelance reporters or independent contractors in depositions and other situations that require an official legal transcript, such as arbitration hearings or other formal proceedings. CART providers (Communication Access Realtime Translation) also often provide realtime services for public events, religious services, webcasts, and educational services. Stenographic court reporting most often allows for a quality transcript produced on an hourly, daily, expedited, or standard turnaround.

Stenographic court reporters working as broadcast captioners often contract with or by television producers and stations to provide realtime closed captioning of live programs.

== Canada ==
=== Education ===
There is one NCRA-approved captioning and court reporting program in all of Canada, which is found at the Northern Institute of Technology (NAIT) in Edmonton, Alberta. It is a two-year course that teaches machine shorthand (stenography). To obtain a diploma, one must pass two-voice speed tests at 225 words per minute with 95% accuracy. Other classes include software training, English, and law. NAIT also offers the NCRA A to Z® Program, a free six-week course that introduces the basics of steno. Between 2017 and 2020, graduates of NAIT's captioning and court reporting program reported a median salary of $70,000 CAD.

=== Professional associations ===
There are three active professional associations in Canada: Association professionnelle des sténographes officiels du Québec (APSOQ), Alberta Shorthand Reporters Association (ASRA), and British Columbia Shorthand Reporters Association (BCSRA).

=== Designations ===
==== Certified Shorthand Reporter (Alberta) ====
After graduating school and completing an internship, Alberta court reporters must earn continuing education credits to maintain their Certified Shorthand Reporter designation, which is a protected title under the Professional and Occupational Associations Registration Act of Alberta. Certified Shorthand Reporters must be members of the ASRA.

Certified Shorthand Reporters are highly skilled professionals who are required to have post-secondary education from an accredited court reporting school with an emphasis on grammar, law, medical terminology, and Canadian legal procedures; complete a supervised internship; and participate in professional development opportunities.

==== Official Reporter (British Columbia) ====
An Official Reporter designation is granted by the Attorney General of BC. To receive such a designation, a person must be able to write 200+ word per minute using shorthand.

An examination for discovery must be conducted before an official reporter who is empowered to administer the oath.

==== Authorized Reporter (British Columbia) ====
An Authorized Reporter designation is granted by the Attorney General of BC. To receive such a designation, a person must either "have 1,000 hours of work experience performing the functions of an official reporter...within two of the immediately past five years" or "hold certification as a real time reporter with NCRA and have at least 500 hours of work experience performing the functions of an official reporter within two of the past five years."

== United Kingdom ==
=== England and Wales ===
Court stenographers were phased out with the Old Bailey being the last court to stop using them in March 2012. It has been replaced by the Digital Audio Recording and Transcription and Storage (Darts) service which is a digital recording system. The Ministry of Justice hopes this will be more cost effective. This process was implmented as part of £5 million worth of cuts to the Crown Court under the Cameron–Clegg coalition. The digital recordings are not automatically transcribed, access to them is extremely limited and the costs to get transcripts transcribed can be prohibitive. In 2023 a rape victim reportedly was quote £7,500 to obtain a transcript of the rape trail.

== Methods ==
Court reporters use stenography to capture the spoken word verbatim. The skills of court reporters are primarily measured through certification exams and licensing. The training on a stenograph machine requires the person to pass writing speed tests of up to 225 words a minute on their machine in the United States, as set forth by the National Court Reporters Association (NCRA). Only a small percentage of court reporting students per year are able to reach this goal, but with NCRA's "A to Z Steno" program and virtual classrooms around the country, the number of stenographic court reporters is on the rise.

Court recorders use multi-channel, digital audio to allow for isolated playback of channels during transcription. This allows transcribers to listen from different vantage points when playing back the audio. This multi-channel feature especially helps during moments of extraneous noise such as laughter, shouting, coughing, and sneezing, but it is still deemed inferior to having a stenographic reporter during the proceedings. The American Association of Electronic Recorders and Transcribers (AAERT) certifies recorders and transcribers. AAERT certified recorders are trained to attempt to monitor the recording continuously during a proceeding and create simple notes, or a log, which are individually time-stamped. The time-stamps correspond with the location on the digital recording for playback either upon request during a proceeding or at a later time. The log notes provide the opportunity to search and identify any segment of the proceeding. Some courts train clerks or other court personnel to operate the digital recording equipment. While court systems benefit from the income from these systems directly, the equipment is maintained by outside vendors and staff cannot repair malfunctioning equipment even if aware of the problem. Courtroom monitors are responsible for listening to the recording through headphones while the proceeding occurs. However, there is no way to ensure recording quality.

Court reporters can also use voice writing equipment to take down court proceedings. Called "voice writers," they dictate verbatim what attorneys, witnesses, and others are saying into a stenomask, which is connected to a computer and uses voice recognition software. This training requires a person pass dictation speed tests of up to 225 words a minute in the United States, as set forth by the National Verbatim Reporters Association (NVRA).

== See also ==
- Stenographer
- Communication access real-time translation
- Closed captioning
- Stenotype
- Real-time transcription
- Shorthand
