= Input =

Input may refer to:

== Computing ==
- Input (computer science), the act of entering data into a computer or data processing system
- Information, any data entered into a computer or data processing system
- Input device
- Input method
- Input port (disambiguation)
- Input/output (I/O), in computing

== Other ==
- Input (talk show)
- Input (typeface)
- International Public Television Screening Conference (INPUT), an international public television organization
- Input (online magazine), an online technology and culture magazine owned by Bustle Digital Group

== See also ==
- Independent variable in a mathematical function
- In economics, a factor of production, a resource employed to produce goods and services
- Advice (opinion)
- Impute (disambiguation)
- Output (disambiguation)
