= Imputation =

Imputation can refer to:

- Imputation (law), the concept that ignorance of the law does not excuse
- Imputation (statistics), substitution of some value for missing data
- Imputation (genetics), estimation of unmeasured genotypes
- Theory of imputation, the theory that factor prices are determined by output prices
- Imputation (game theory), a distribution that benefits each player who cooperates in a game
- Imputed righteousness, a concept in Christian theology
- Double imputation, a concept in Christian theology
- Imputation of sin, a theory for the transmission of original sin from Adam to his progeny

== See also ==
- Geo-imputation, a method in geographical information systems
- Dividend imputation, a method of attributing a company's income tax to its shareholders
