= Imputation and Variance Estimation Software =

Analytics software

IVEware
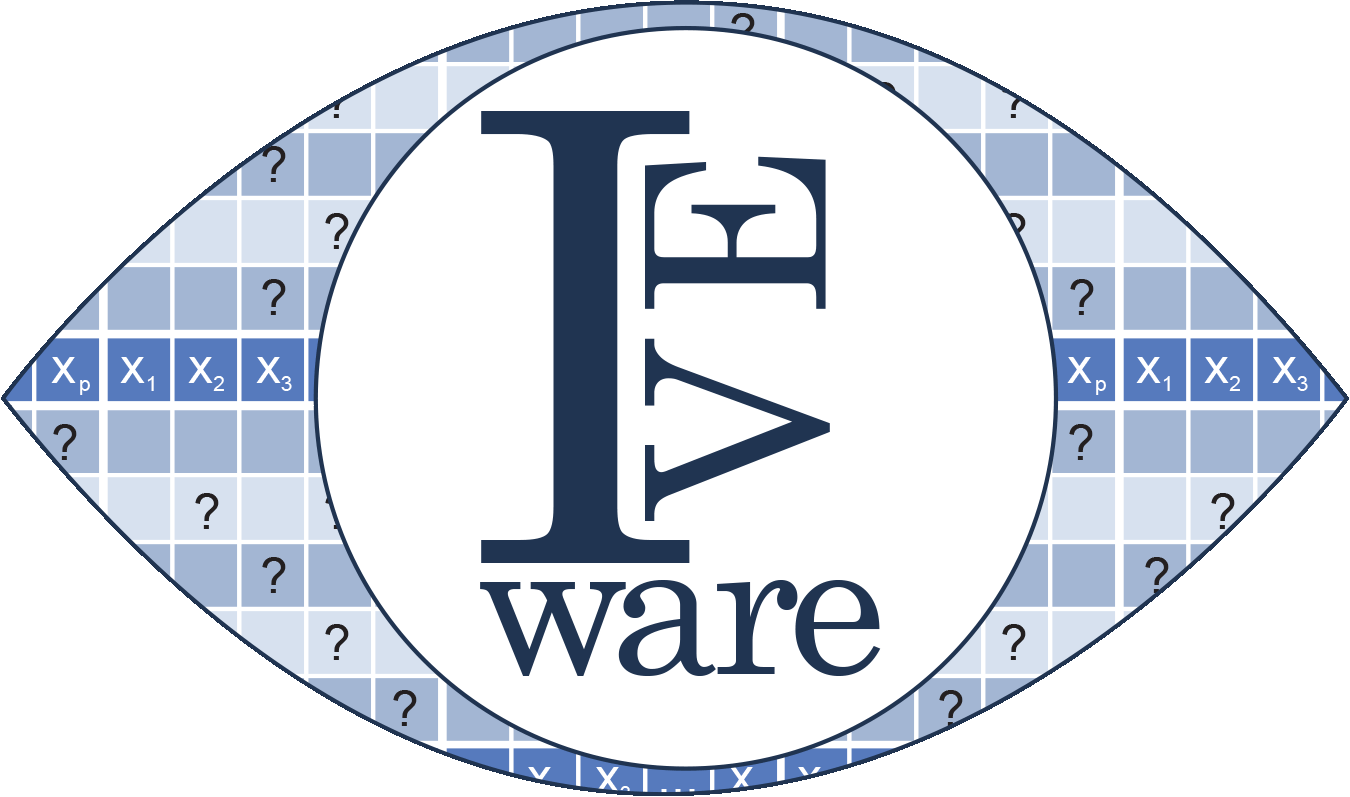
- Original author(s): Trivellore Raghunathan Peter W. Solenberger John Van Hoewyk Patricia Berglund
- Developer(s): Survey Research Center
- Initial release: late 1990s
- Stable release: 0.3 / 2017; 8 years ago
- Operating system: Windows, macOS, Linux
- Type: Statistical analysis
- License: Freeware
- Website: www.src.isr.umich.edu/software/

Imputation and Variance Estimation Software (IVEware) is a collection of routines written under various platforms and packaged to perform multiple imputations, variance estimation (or standard error) and, in general, draw inferences from incomplete data. It can also be used to perform analysis without any missing data. IVEware defaults to assuming a simple random sample, but uses the Jackknife Repeated Replication or Taylor Series Linearization techniques for analyzing data from complex surveys.

== Overview ==
Version 0.1 of IVEware was developed in the late 1990s by Trivellore Raghunathan, Peter W. Solenberger, and John Van Hoewyk and released in 1997 as beta software with an official release in 2002 from the Survey Research Center, University of Michigan Institute for Social Research. Version 0.2 was released in 2011 and the newest version, V 0.3, was released in 2017.

The software includes seven modules: IMPUTE, BBDESIGN, DESCRIBE, REGRESS, SASMOD, SYNTHESIZE, and COMBINE.

IVEware can be run with SAS, Stata, R, SPSS or as a stand-alone tool under the Windows or Linux environment. The R, Stata, SPSS and stand-alone version can also be used with the Mac OS. The stand-alone version has limited capabilities for analyzing multiply imputed data though the routines for creating imputations are the same across all packages. And the command structure is the same across all platforms. IVEware can be executed using the built-in XML editor or it can be run using the built-in editor within the four software packages previously mentioned. The user can also mix and match the codes from these software packages through a standard XML toggle-parser (for example, < SAS name = “myfile” > SAS commands < /SAS > will execute the SAS commands and store the commands in the file “myfile.sas”.) if the provided XML editor is used to execute IVEware commands.
