= Geo-imputation =

In data analysis involving geographical locations, geo-imputation or geographical imputation methods are steps taken to replace missing values for exact locations with approximate locations derived from associated data. They assign a reasonable location or geographic based attribute (e.g., census tract) to a person by using both the demographic characteristics of the person and the population characteristics from a larger geographic aggregate area in which the person was geocoded (e.g., postal delivery area or county). For example, if a person's census tract was known and no other address information was available then geo-imputation methods could be used to probabilistically assign that person to a smaller geographic area, such as a census block group.

== See also ==
- Geocoding
- Imputation (statistics)

== Notes and references ==
- Jones, S. G.; Ashby, A. J.; Momin, S. R.; Naidoo, A. (2010) "Spatial Implications Associated with Using Euclidean Distance Measurements and Geographic Centroid Imputation in Health Care Research", Health Services Research, 45 (1), 316–327 doi:10.1111/j.1475-6773.2009.01044.x
