= Output =

Output may refer to:

- The information produced by a computer, see Input/output
- An output state of a system, see state (computer science)
- Output (economics), the amount of goods and services produced
  - Gross output in economics, the value of net output or GDP plus intermediate consumption
  - Net output in economics, the gross revenue from production less the value of goods and services
- Power (physics) or Work (physics) output of a machine
- Dependent variable of a function, in mathematics
- Output (album)

== See also ==
- Input (disambiguation)
