= Listwise deletion =

Statistical method for handling missing data

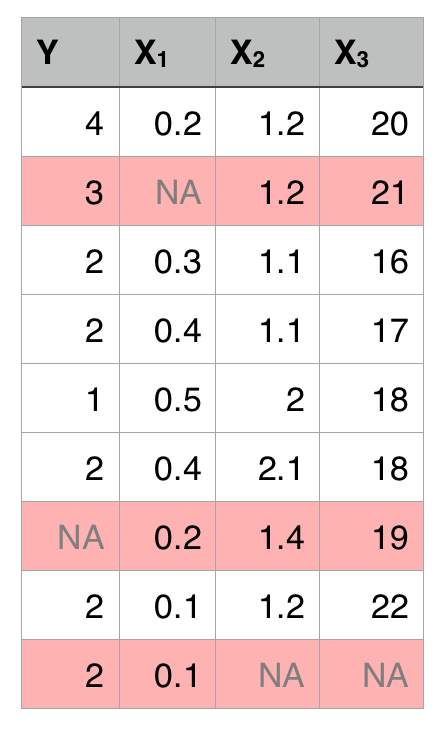
A visual example of list wise deletion

In statistics, listwise deletion is a method for handling missing data. In this method, an entire record is excluded from analysis if any single value is missing.

== Example ==
For example, consider the following questionnaire, as answered by 10 subjects:

Subject	Age	Gender	Income
1	29	M	$40,000
2	45	M	$36,000
3	81	M	--missing--
4	22	--missing--	$16,000
5	41	M	$98,000
6	33	F	$60,000
7	22	F	$24,000
8	--missing--	F	$81,000
9	33	F	$55,000
10	45	F	$80,000

A researcher is hoping to model income (dependent variable) based on age and gender (independent variables). Using listwise deletion, the researcher would remove subjects 3, 4, and 8 from the sample before performing any further analysis.

== Problems with listwise deletion ==
Listwise deletion affects statistical power of the tests conducted. Statistical power relies in part on high sample size. Because listwise deletion excludes data with missing values, it reduces the sample which is being statistically analysed.

Listwise deletion is also problematic when the reason for missing data may not be random (i.e., questions in questionnaires aiming to extract sensitive information. Due to the method, much of the subjects' data will be excluded from analysis, leaving a bias in data findings. For instance, a questionnaire may include questions about respondents drug use history, current earnings, or sexual persuasions. Many of the subjects in the sample may not answer due to the intrusive nature of the questions, but may answer all other items. Listwise deletion will exclude these respondents from analysis. This may create a bias as participants who do divulge this information may have different characteristics than participants who do not. Multiple imputation is an alternate technique for dealing with missing data that attempts to eliminate this bias.

== Compared to other methods ==
While listwise deletion does have its problems, it is preferable to many other methods for handling missing data. In some cases, it may even be the least problematic method. The following table provides some comparisons of listwise deletions to other methods:

Method	Comparison
Pairwise deletion	Ambiguous definition of sample size causes bias in estimated standard errors and test statistics.
Dummy variable adjustment	Produces biased estimates of coefficients.
