= Griffin PowerMate =

Discontinued input device formerly produced by Griffin Technology

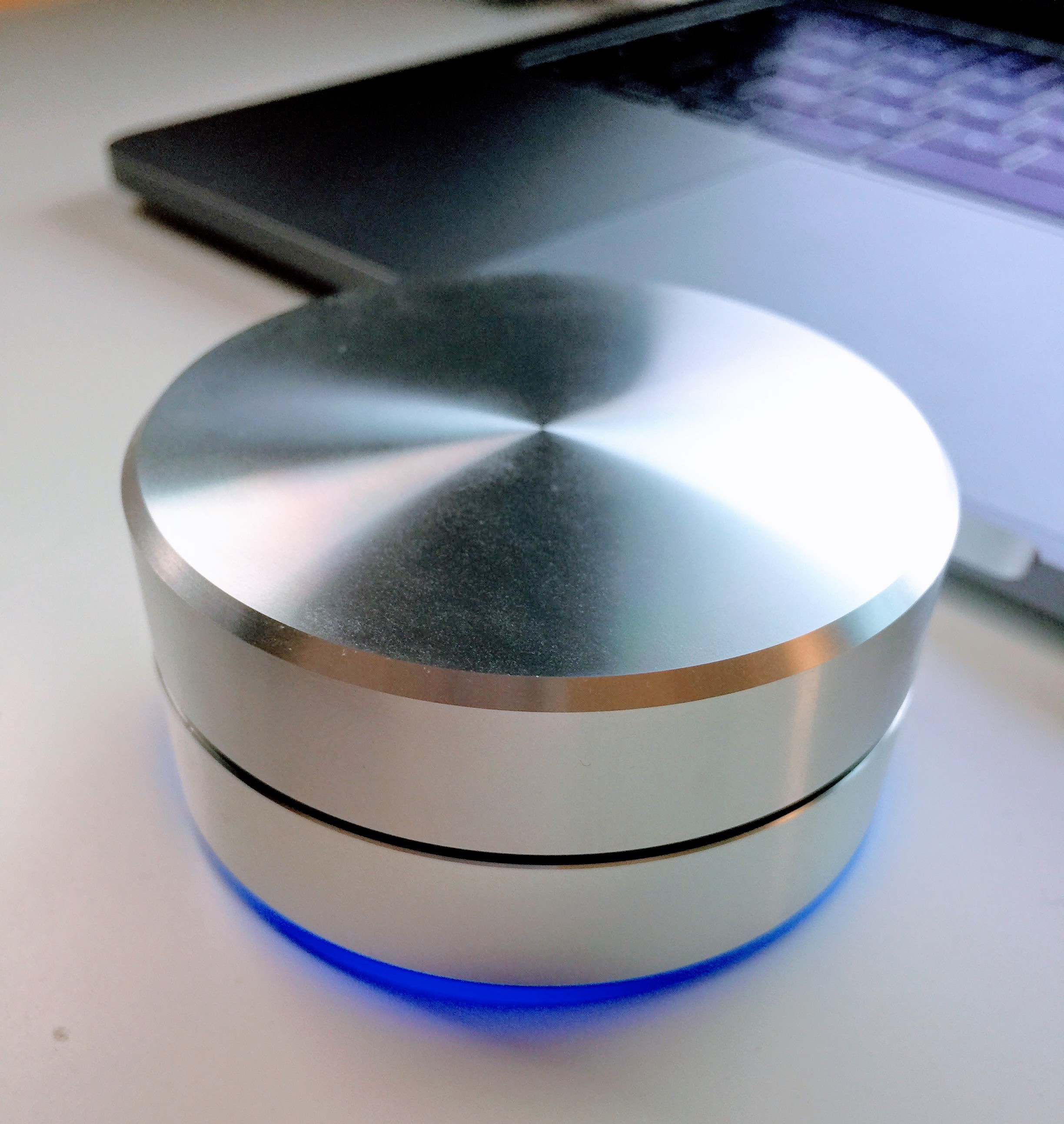
The Griffin PowerMate Bluetooth

The Griffin PowerMate is a discontinued input device formerly produced by Griffin Technology. First released in 2001, it is a multifunction knob, which can be rotated, pressed, and rotated while pressed. It is a type of paddle controller. These actions can be programmed to invoke specific responses from a range of computer applications, such as changing the volume, or skipping through videos.

A video demonstrating the PowerMate changing the volume on MacOS

The PowerMate is also equipped with a blue LED on the underside, which can be programmed to flash, pulse, or remain illuminated at various intensities in response to input from the attached computer .

The original PowerMate required a USB port, but a wireless Bluetooth version was introduced in 2014. More than one PowerMate could be used at one time. At points in its history the PowerMate was available in black. The product was discontinued in 2018.

== Example setup ==
The PowerMate can be set up such that the clockwise/counter-clockwise rotation of the input device causes scrolling up and down of a web page in a web browser when it is in focus on the desktop, or the system audio volume when it is not. The status LED on the underside of the PowerMate could be set up as an indicator of resource usage, e.g., CPU usage, when the input device is not in use, and when in use the LED could be set to indicate volume level by LED brightness.

The configuration software allows for custom configuration for each software application. A video editing program can use the PowerMate to scroll through the timeline. Or it can be configured to scroll through your browser page history and push to refresh. It would also work well for breakout-style games. By adding "Key Press" actions, PowerMate can be configured to perform any particular software function for which there is a "send key" command - i.e., a keyboard shortcut of one or more keys. By setting "Actions" (e.g., "Key Press") for "Triggers" (for example, "Long Press" or "Rotate Right"), a user can use PowerMate in place of the keyboard for any command.

== System compatibility ==
The Griffin PowerMate was officially supported on Mac OS X, Windows XP and Vista. Griffin's software for Windows works under Windows 7 and 8 but crashes occasionally; for macOS, there is no official support past 10.12 ("Sierra", released in 2016), though their USB version and configuration software (PowerMate Manager) continues to work on later versions even as recent as macOS Ventura when running on Apple Silicon chip. There are Linux and Sierra+ macOS drivers, but they are unofficial. PowerMate came with its own software and an archived copy of it (version 3.0 from June of 2010) can still be found online.
