= Input port =

Input port may refer to:

- Input device, a generic term for any device that provides input to a system
- Parallel port, a computer hardware interface
- Serial port, a computer hardware interface
- Universal Serial Bus, a computer hardware interface
- IEEE 1394 interface, a computer hardware interface, known commonly as Firewire
- PS/2 connector, a common computer interface for mice and keyboards

== See also ==
- Output device
- Peripheral device
- Computer hardware
- Computer keyboard
- Mouse (computer)
