= Input device =

Device that provides data and signals to a computer

A common computer input device, a keyboard. A user presses a key which transfers information to a computer.

In computing, an input device is a piece of equipment used to enter data and control signals to an information processing system, such as a computer or information appliance. Examples of input devices include keyboards, computer mice, scanners, cameras, joysticks, and microphones.

Input devices can be categorized based on:

- Modality of output (e.g., mechanical motion, audio, visual, etc.)
- Whether the output is discrete (e.g., pressing of key) or continuous (e.g., a mouse's position, though digitized into a discrete quantity, is fast enough to be considered continuous)
- The number of degrees of freedom involved (e.g., two-dimensional traditional mice, or three-dimensional navigators designed for CAD applications)

== Keyboard ==
A keyboard is a human interface device which is represented as a matrix of buttons. Each button, or key, can be used to either input an alphanumeric character to a computer, or to call upon a particular function of the computer. It acts as the main text entry interface for most users..

=== Types ===
Keyboards are available in many form factors, depending on the use case. Standard keyboards can be categorized by its size and number of keys, and the type of switch it employs. Other keyboards cater to specific use cases, such as a numeric keypad or a keyer.

Desktop keyboards are typically large, often have full key travel distance, and features such as multimedia keys and a numeric keypad. Keyboards on laptops and tablets typically compromise on comfort to achieve a thin figure.

There are various switch technologies used in modern keyboards, such as mechanical switches (which use springs), scissor switches (usually found on a laptop keyboard), or a membrane.

Other keyboards do not have physical keys, such as a virtual keyboard, or a projection keyboard.

Ergonomic keyboard
A keyboard placing design emphasis on ergonomics and comfort.
Chorded keyboard
A keyboard used by pressing several keys together.
Thumb keyboard
A miniature keyboard found in PDAs and mobile phones.
Keyer
A chorded keyboard without the board.
Numeric keypad
While some keyboards include one (commonly found on the right side), numeric keypads can be found as independent devices.

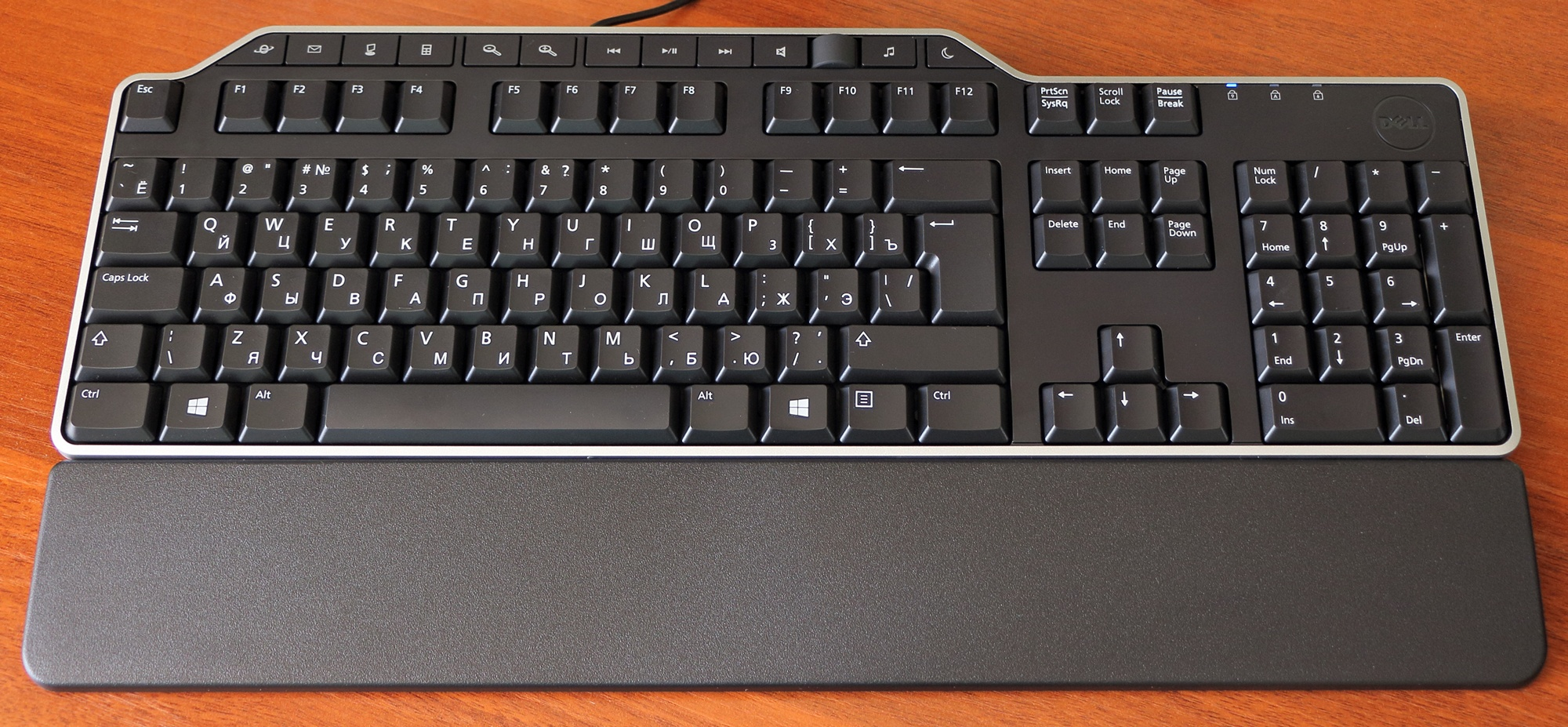
Keyboard

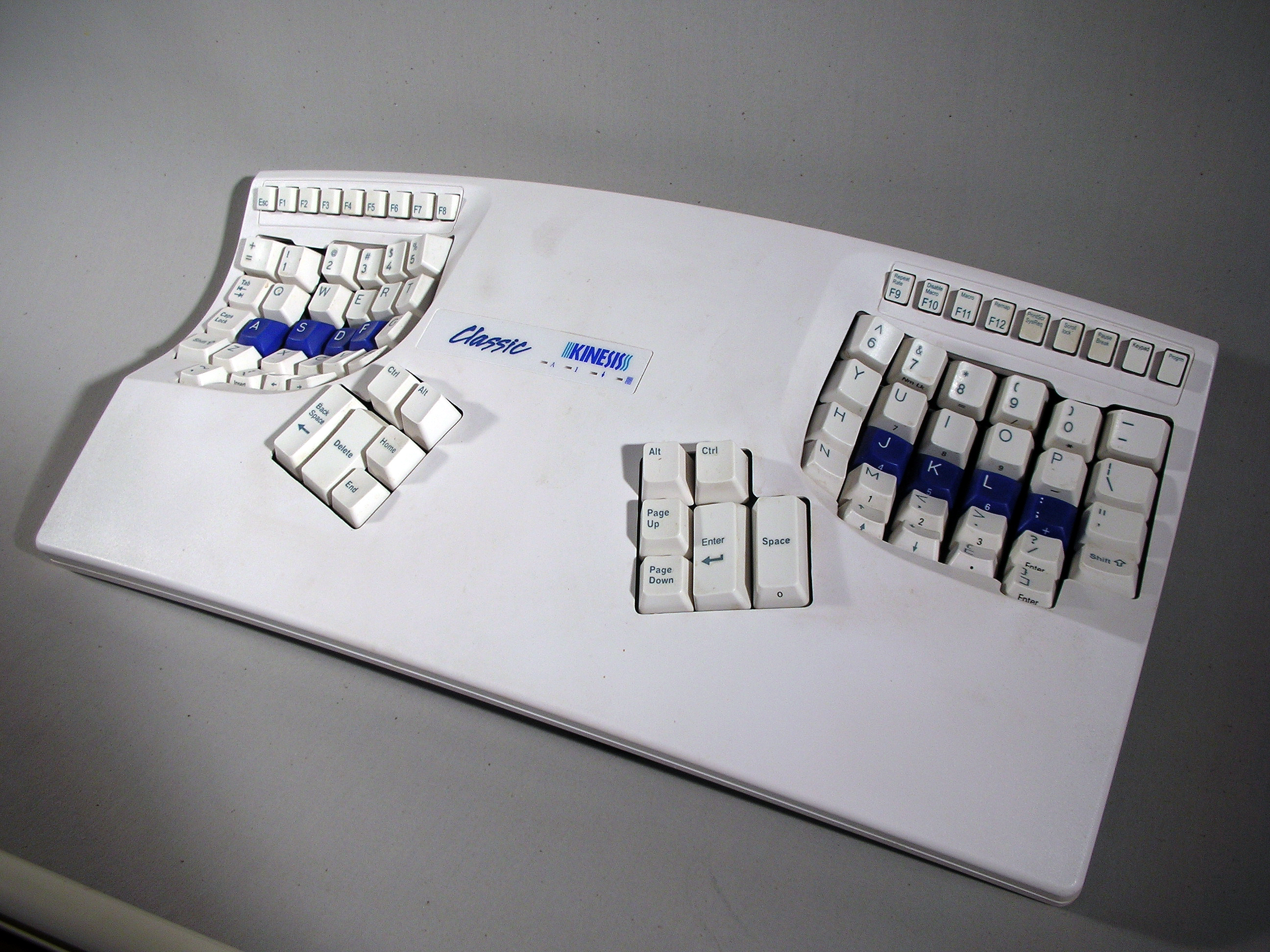
Ergonomic keyboard

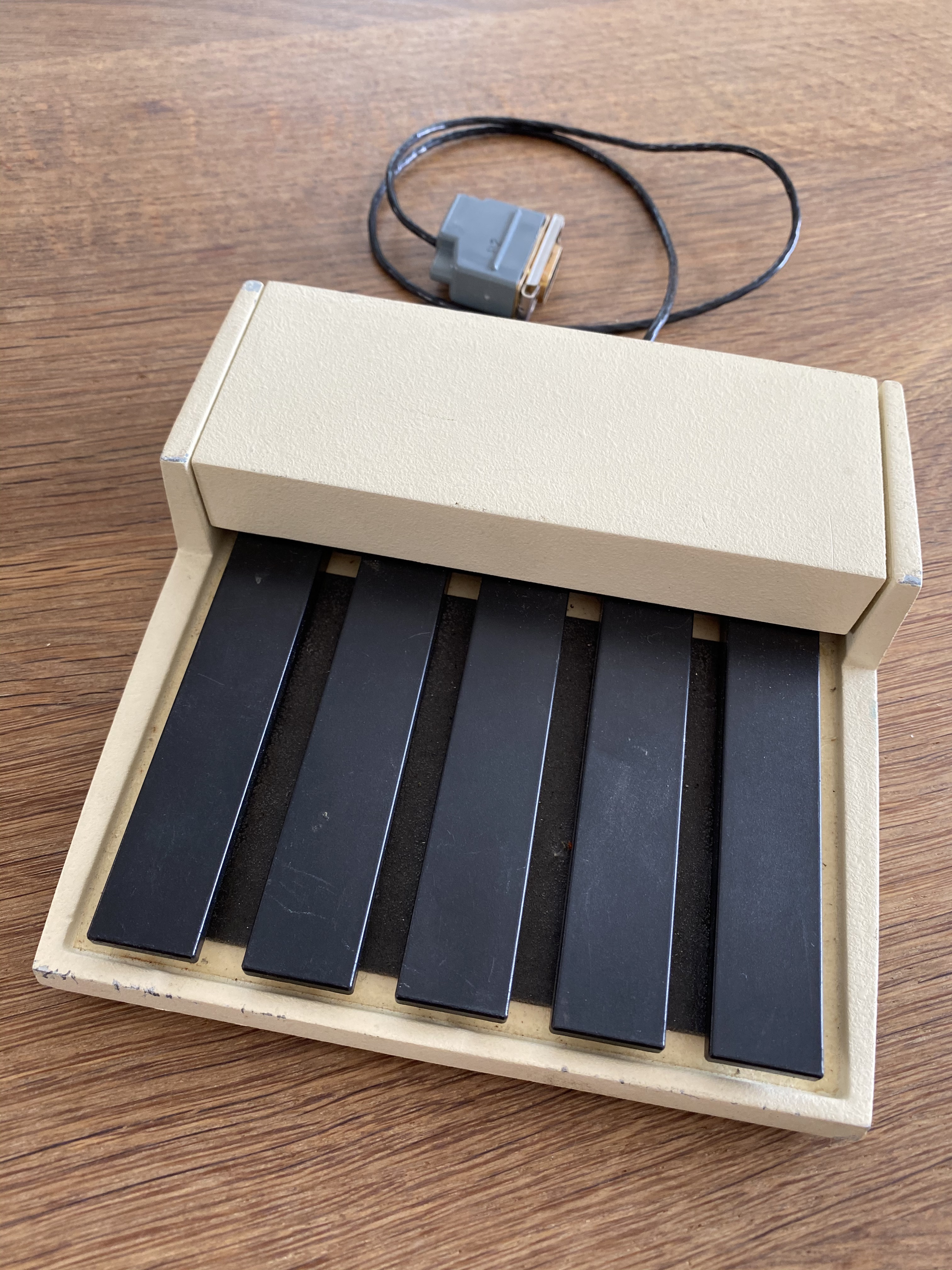
Chorded keyboard

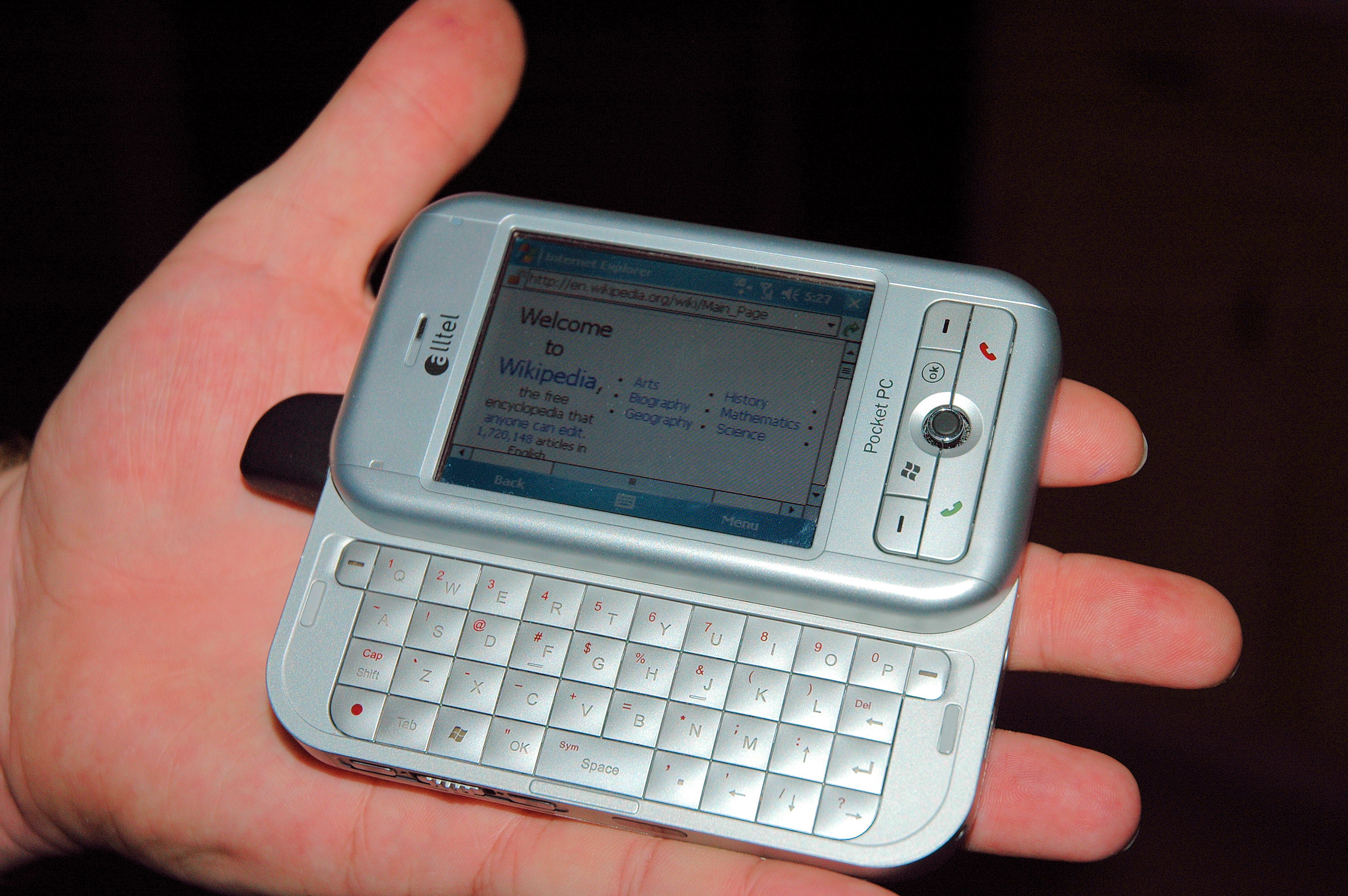
Thumb keyboard

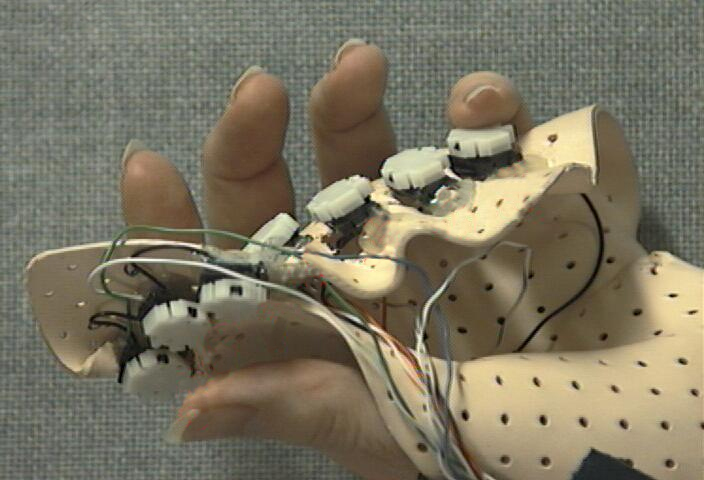
Keyer

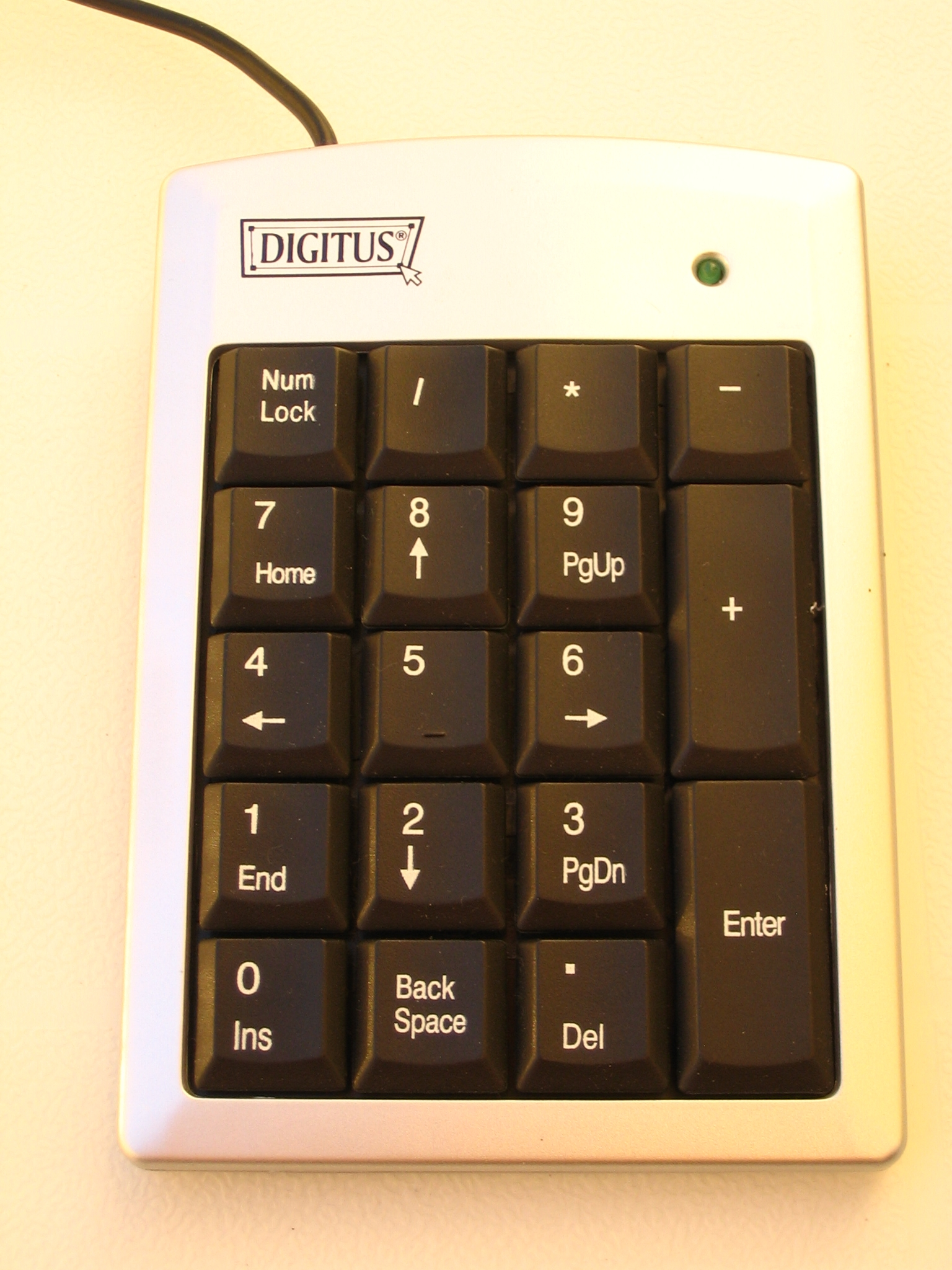
Numeric keypad

== Pointing device ==
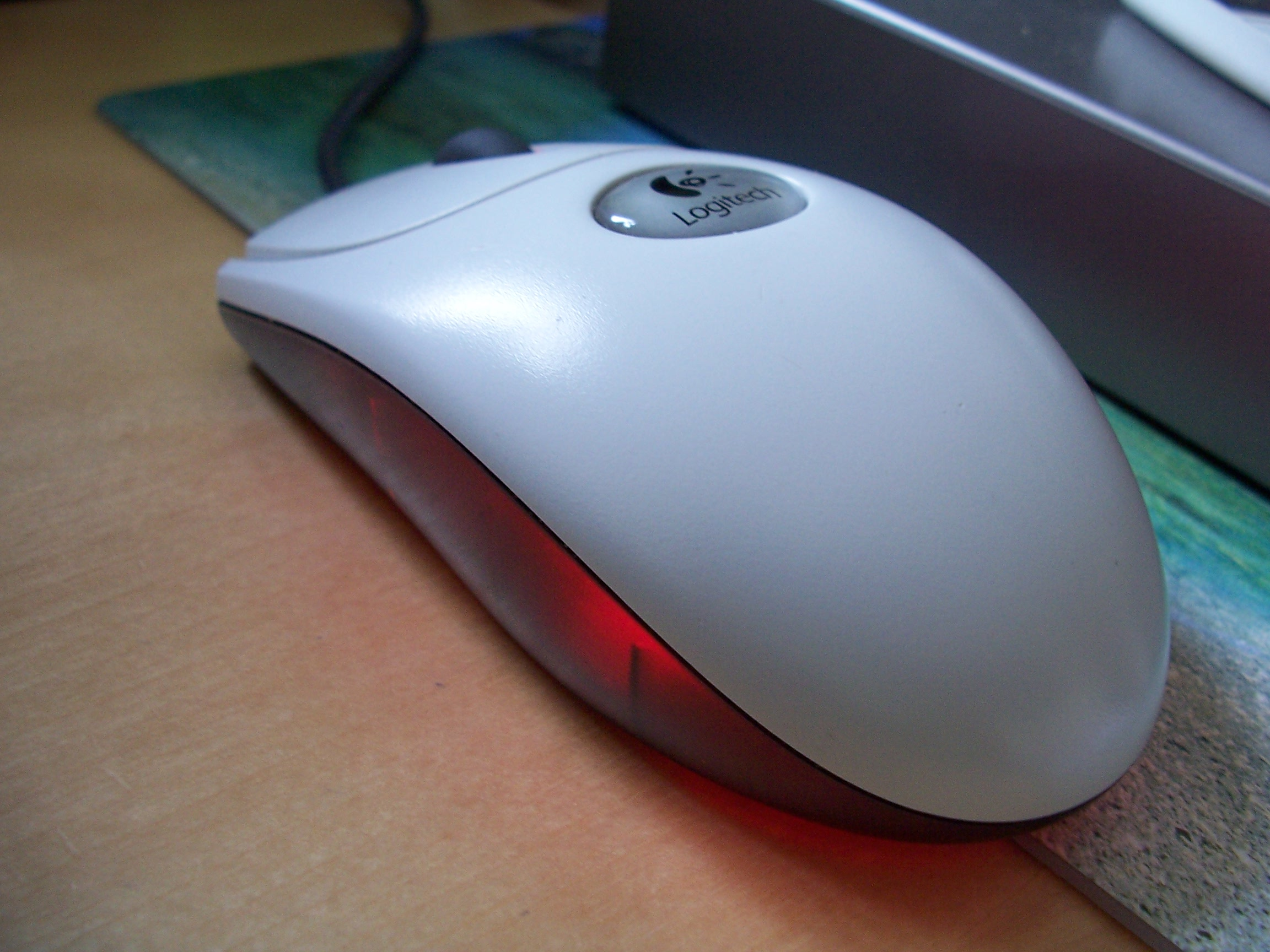
A computer mouse is an example of a pointing device.

A pointing device allows a user to input spatial data to a computer. It is commonly used as a simple and intuitive way to select items on a computer screen on a graphical user interface (GUI), either by moving a mouse pointer, or, in the case of a touch screen, by physically touching the item on screen. Common pointing devices include mice, touchpads, and touch screens.

Whereas mice operate by detecting their displacement on a surface, analog devices, such as 3D mice, joysticks, or pointing sticks, function by reporting their angle of deflection.

=== Types ===
Pointing devices can be classified on:

- Whether the input is direct or indirect. With direct input, the input space coincides with the display space, i.e. pointing is done in the space where visual feedback or the pointer appears. Touchscreens and light pens involve direct input. Examples involving indirect input include the mouse and trackball.
- Whether the positional information is absolute (e.g. on a touch screen) or relative (e.g., with a mouse that can be lifted and repositioned)

Direct input is almost necessarily absolute, but indirect input may be either absolute or relative. For example, digitizing graphics tablets that do not have an embedded screen involve indirect input and sense absolute positions and are often run in an absolute input mode, but they may also be set up to simulate a relative input mode like that of a touchpad, where the stylus or puck can be lifted and repositioned. Embedded LCD tablets, which are also referred to as graphics tablet monitors, are the extension of digitizing graphics tablets. They enable users to see the real-time positions via the screen while being used.

mouse
A hand-held pointing device that is moved across a surface.
touchpad or trackpad
A flat surface operated by moving a finger across its surface.
touch screen
A layer placed over a computer screen, used by physically touching it with one's finger or a stylus.
trackball
Similar to a mouse, a trackball has a ball held by a socket. Instead of moving the mouse, the user rolls the ball with their finger.
graphics tablet, digitizer, or drawing tablet
A flat surface on which a stylus is used, often to draw images or capture signatures.

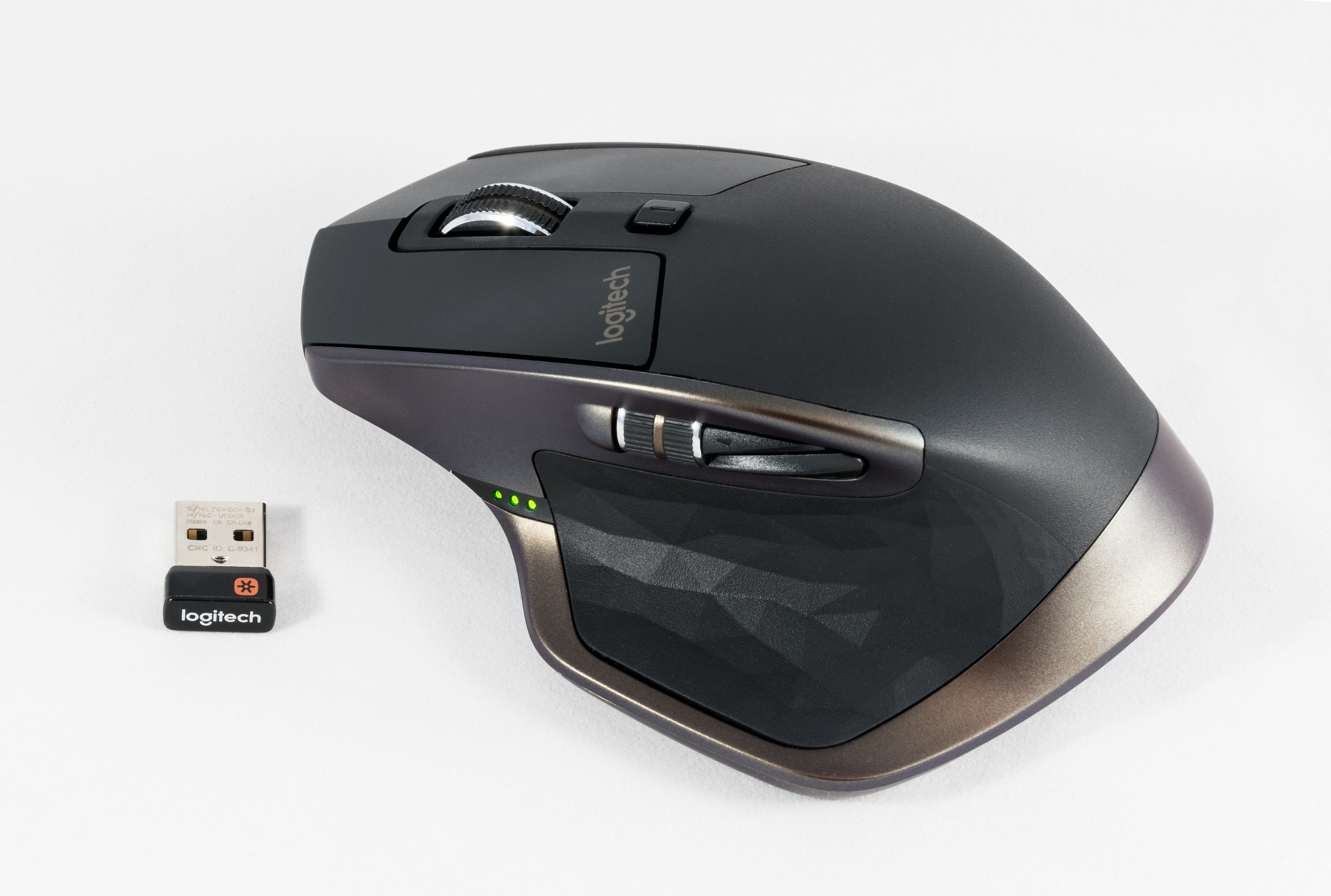
Mouse

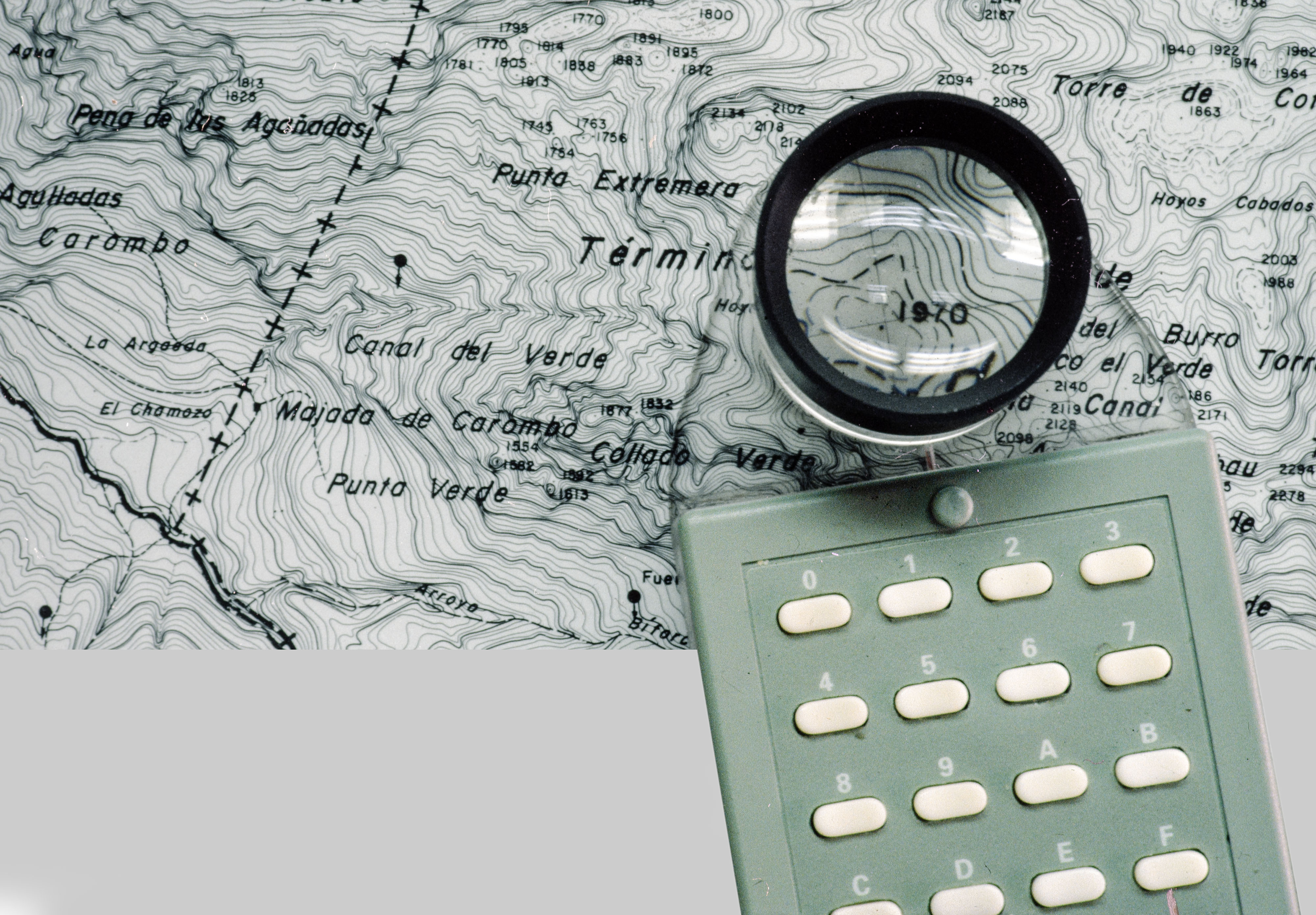
Digitizer mouse

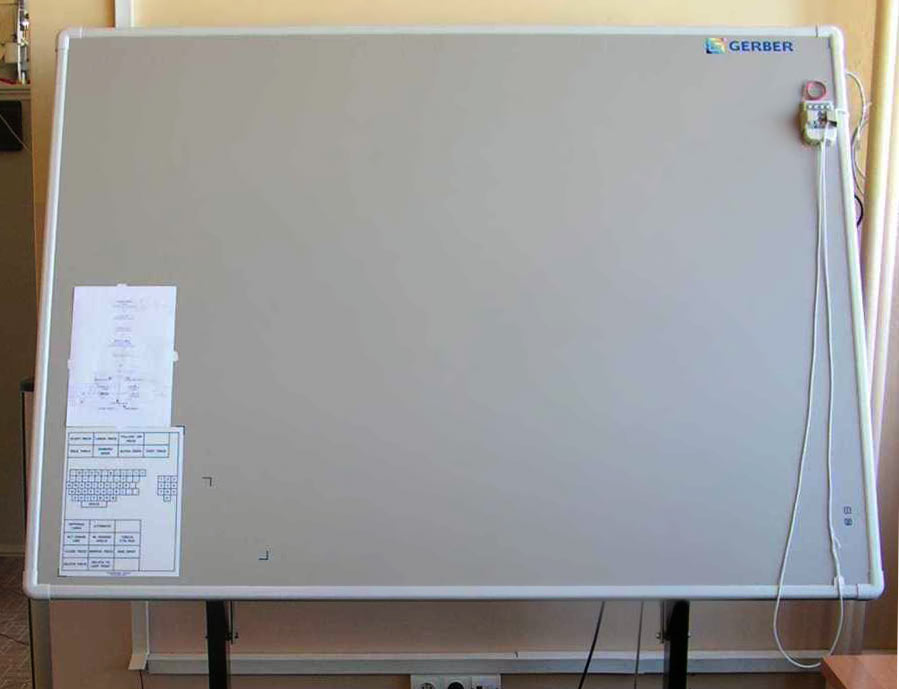
A large-format graphic tablet by manufacturer Summagraphics (OEM'd to Gerber): The puck's external copper coil can be clearly seen. Note using of a Digitizer mouse with a magnifying glass.

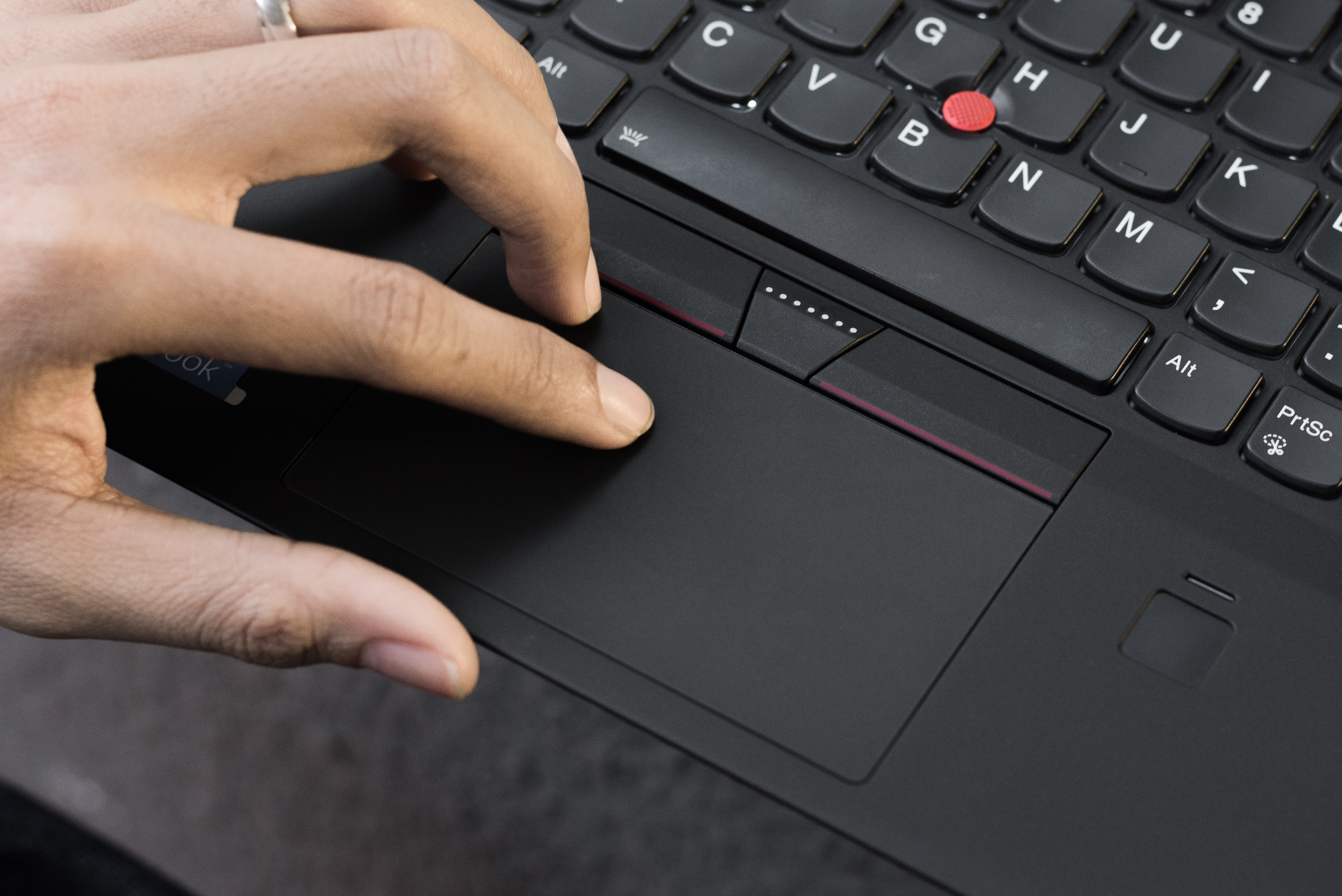
Touchpad (or trackpad)

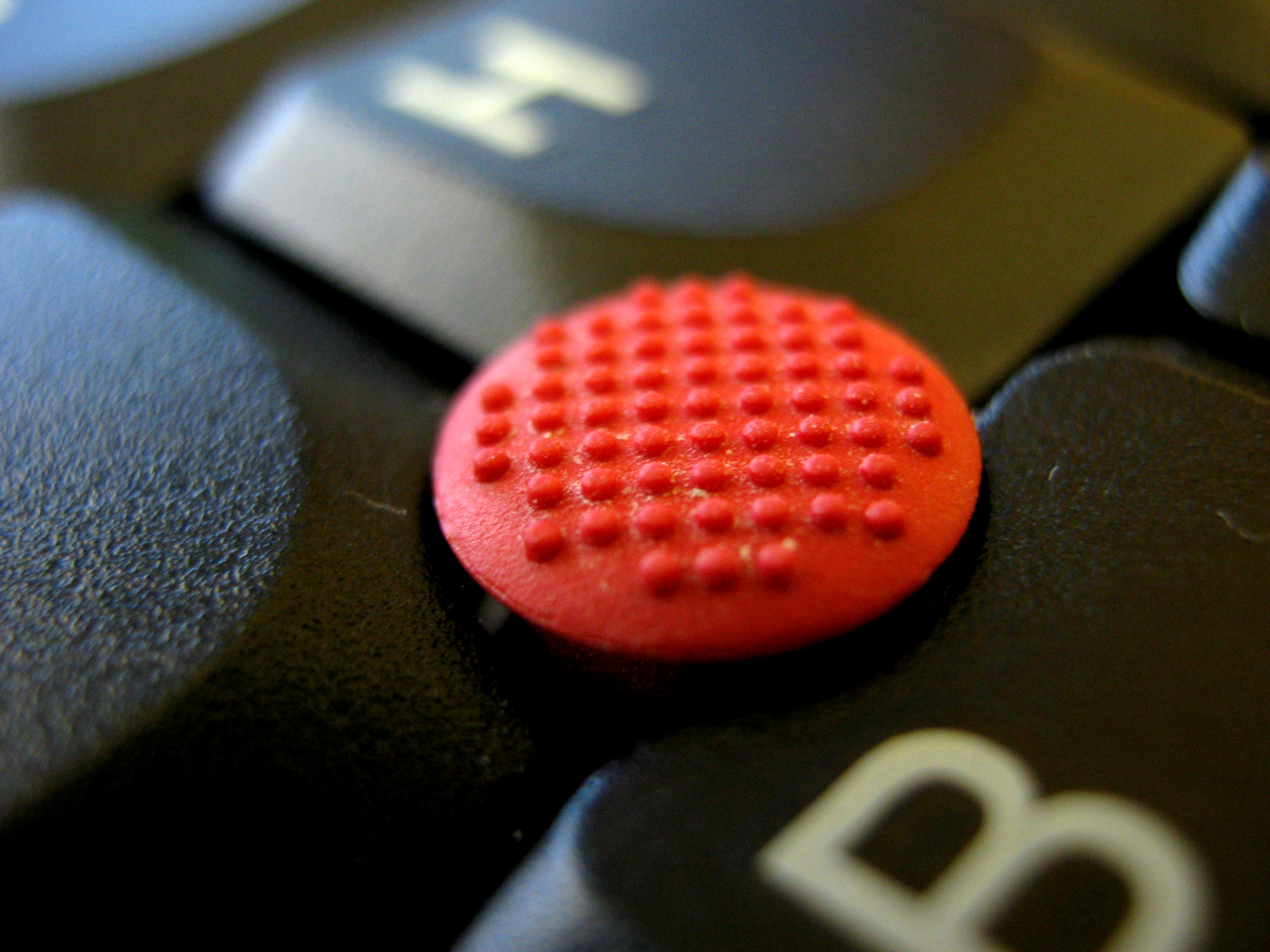
Pointing stick

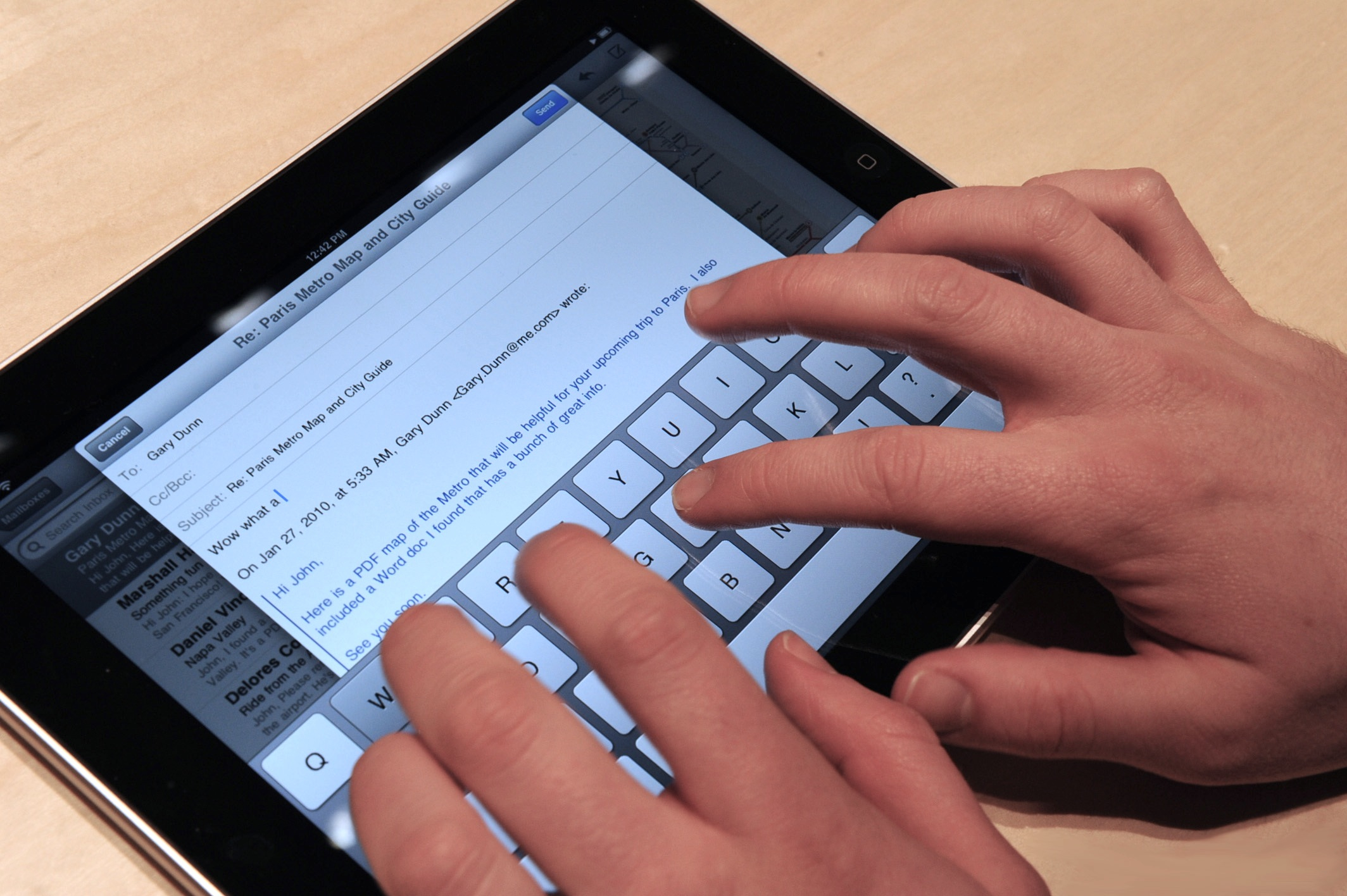
Touchscreen

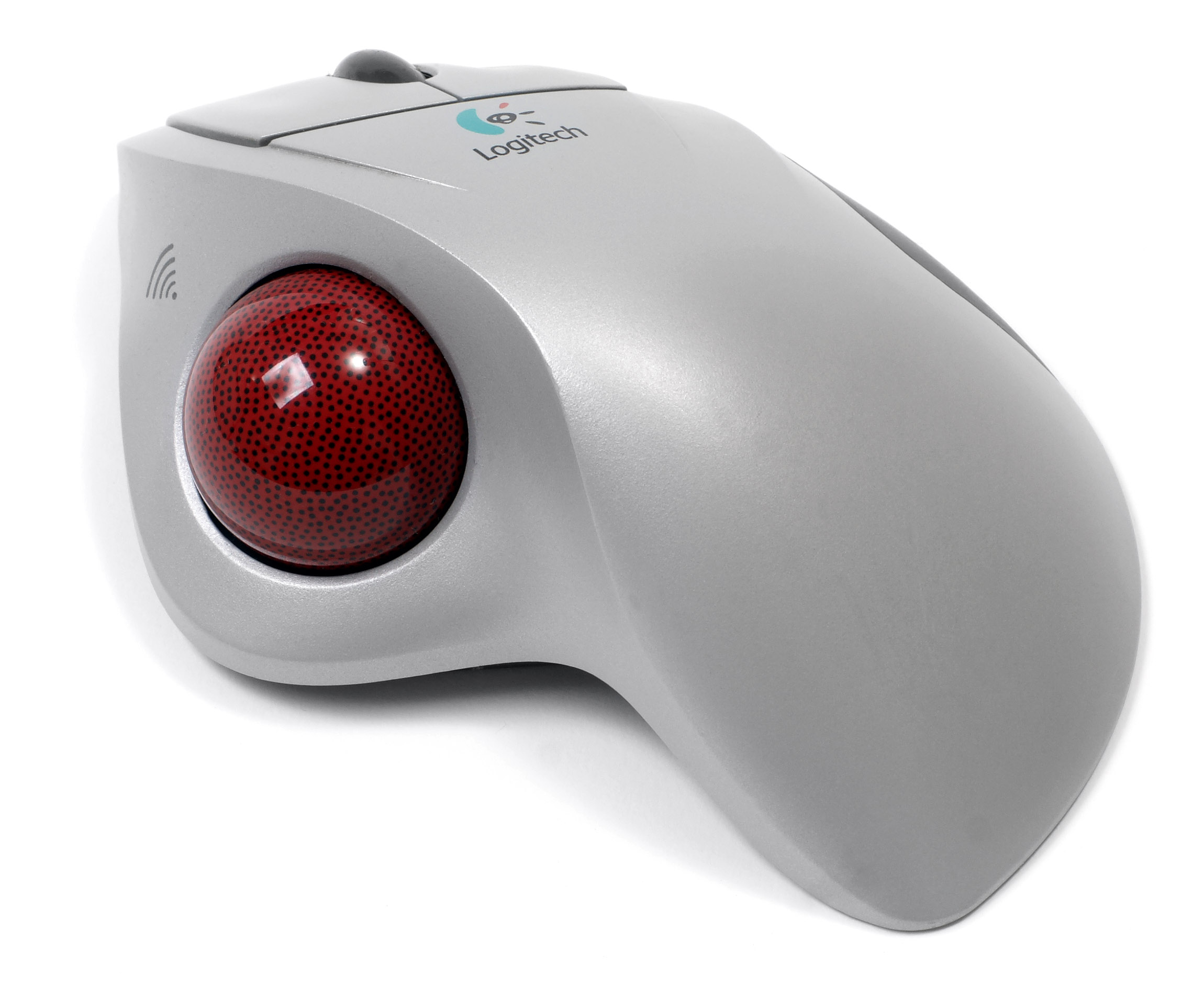
Trackball

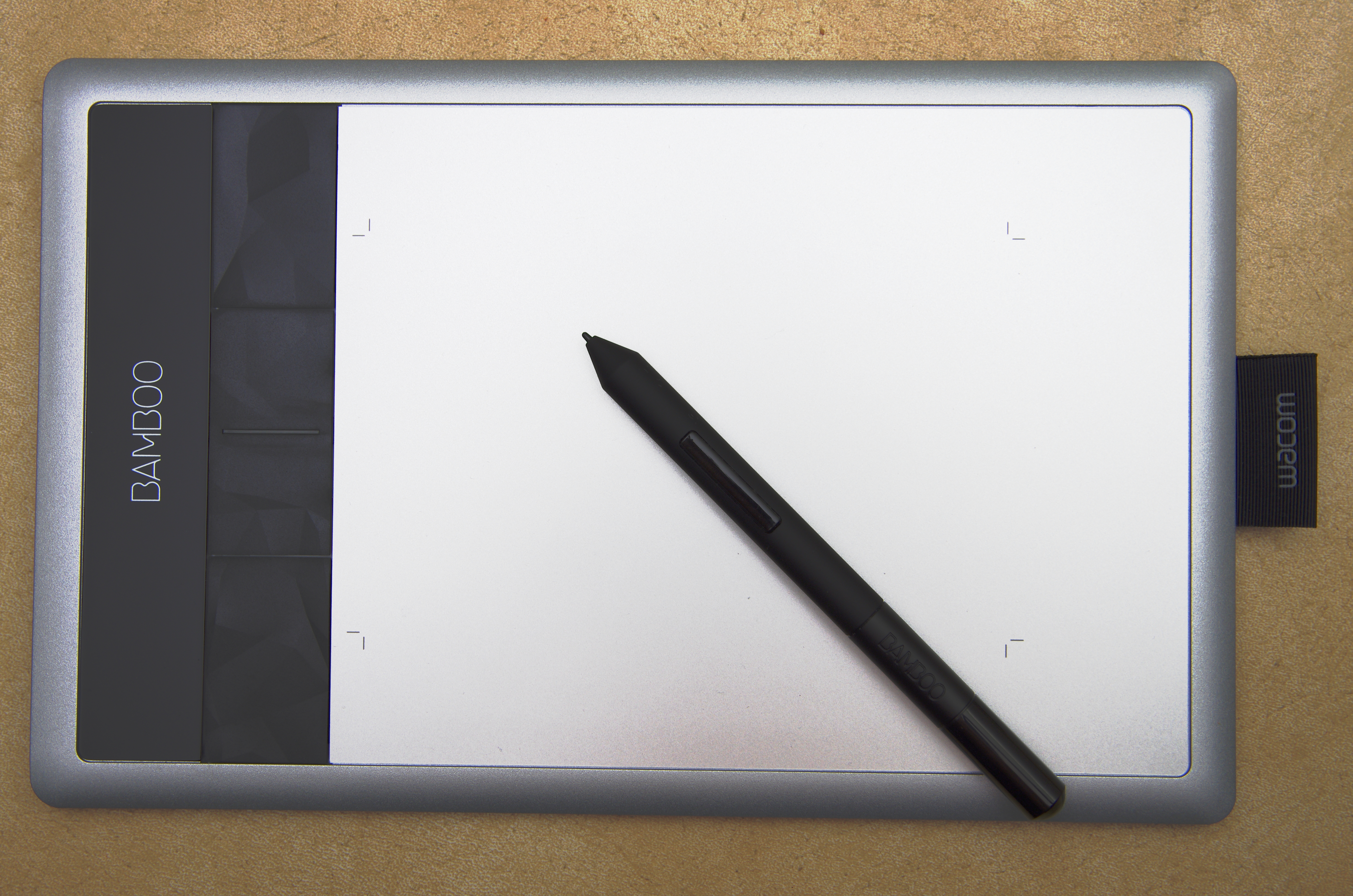
Graphics tablet

== Sensors ==
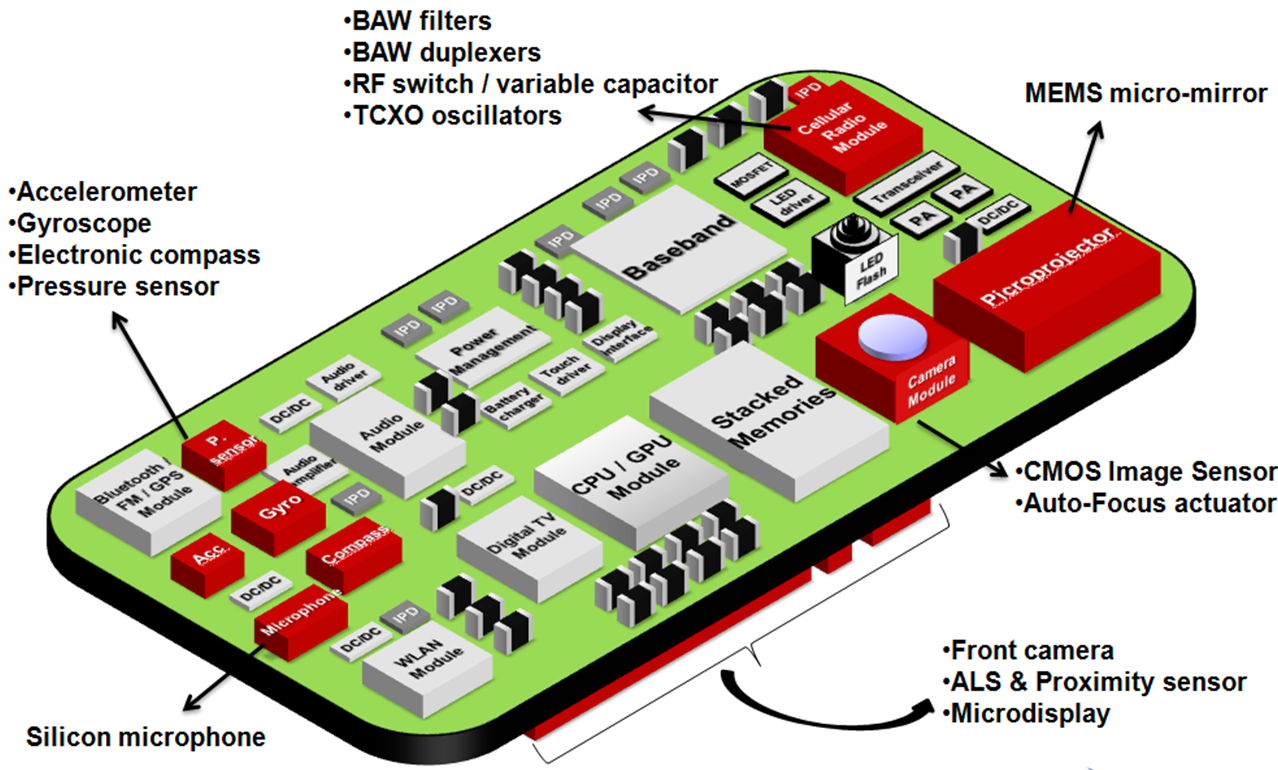
MEMS sensors (among other devices) used in a mobile device

A sensor is an input device which produces data based on physical properties.

Sensors are commonly found in mobile devices to detect their physical orientation and acceleration, but may also be found in desktop computers in the form of a thermometer used to monitor system temperature.

=== Types ===
Accelerometer
Detects acceleration.
Gyroscope
Detects spatial orientation.
Magnetometer
Similar to a compass, a magnetometer senses magnetic heading.
Proximity sensor
Detects whether an object is in proximity.
Barometer
Measures atmospheric pressure. May be used to determine elevation above sea level.
Ultrasonic transducer
Detects movement and range of objects using ultrasound.
LIDAR
Detects the range of objects using laser.
Thermometer
Measures temperature. Usually uses a thermistor or thermocouple.

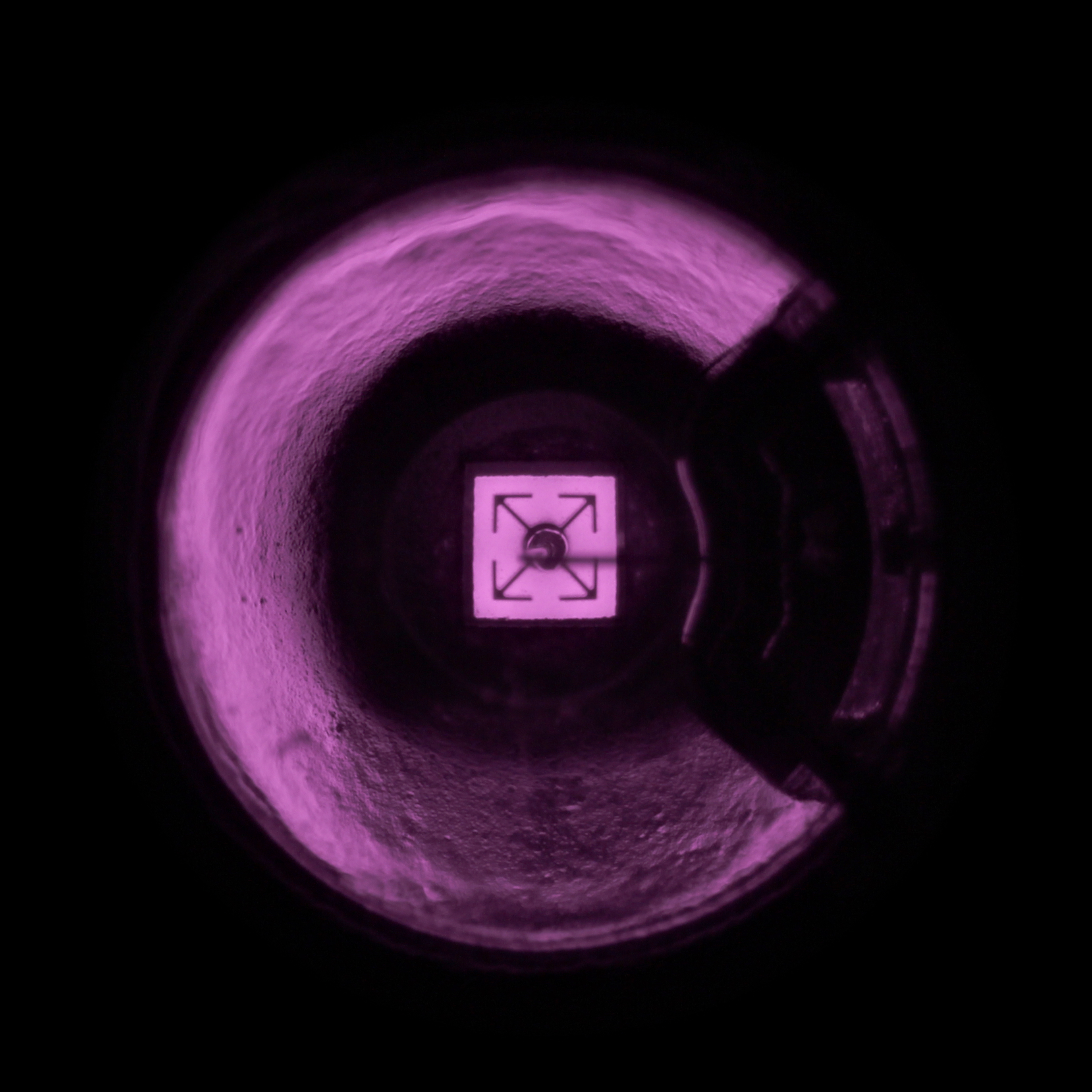
An infrared proximity sensor used in a smartphone allows it to turn off its screen when held up to the user's ear.

Some sensors can be built with MEMS, which allows them to be microscopic in size.

== High-degree of freedom input devices ==
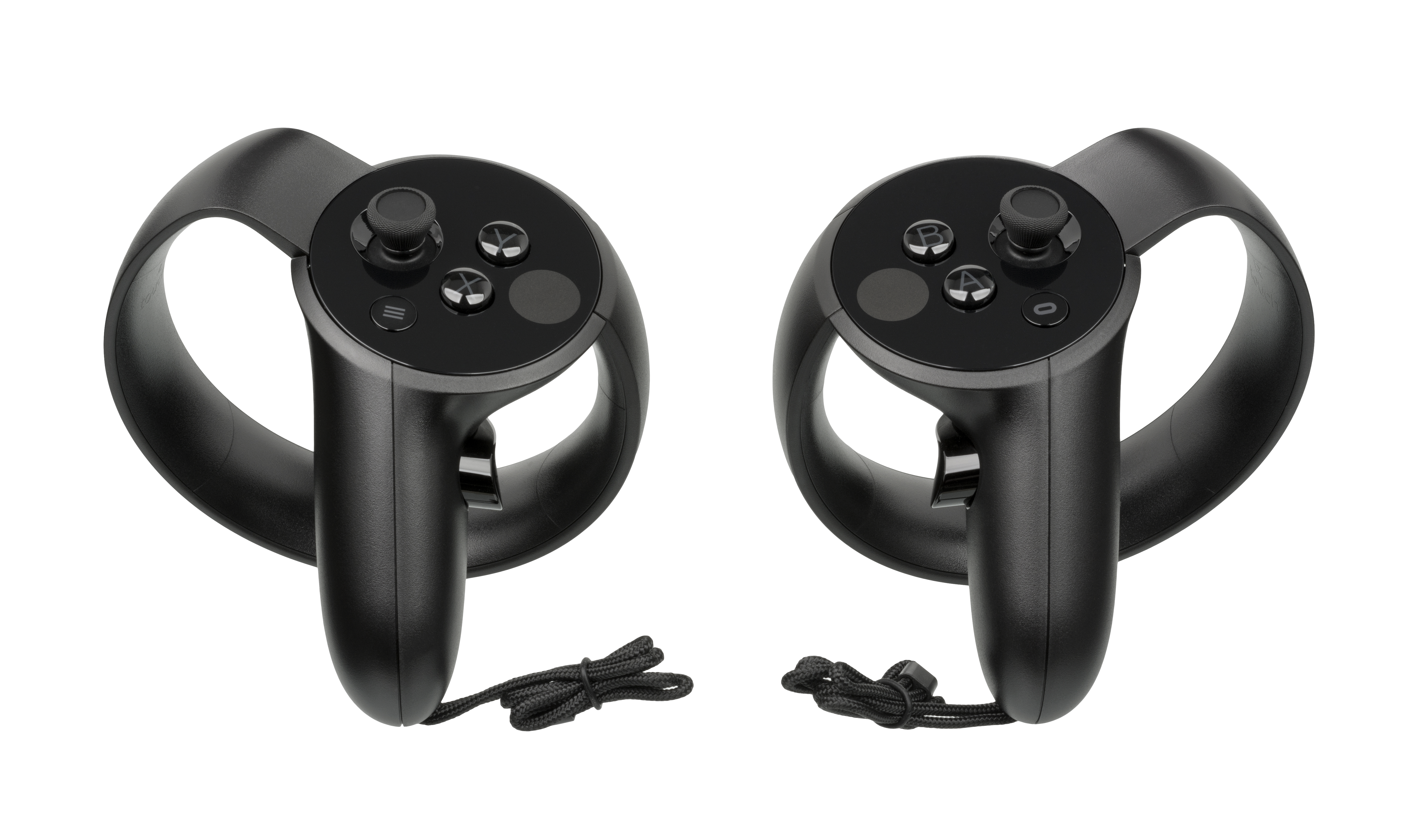
Controllers for use with the Oculus Rift virtual reality system

Some devices allow many continuous degrees of freedom as input. These can be used as pointing devices, but are generally used in ways that don't involve pointing to a location in space, such as the control of a camera angle while in 3D applications. These kinds of devices are typically used in virtual reality systems (CAVEs), where input that registers six degrees of freedom is required.

== Composite devices ==
Input devices, such as buttons and joysticks, can be combined on a single physical device that could be thought of as a composite device. Many gaming devices have controllers like this. Technically mice are composite devices, as they both track movement and provide buttons for clicking, but composite devices are generally considered to have more than two different forms of input.

=== Examples ===
Joystick
Consists of a stick pivoting on a stationary base.
Gamepad, or joypad
Hand held device often used to play modern video games.
Paddle
A paddle could be a game controller consisting of a dial and a button, or an input device such as a Griffin PowerMate or a Microsoft Surface Dial.
Racing wheel
An imitation steering wheel that can be used to play racing video games.
Wii Remote
A remote control used with the Nintendo Wii video game console which integrates an accelerometer and pointing capabilities.

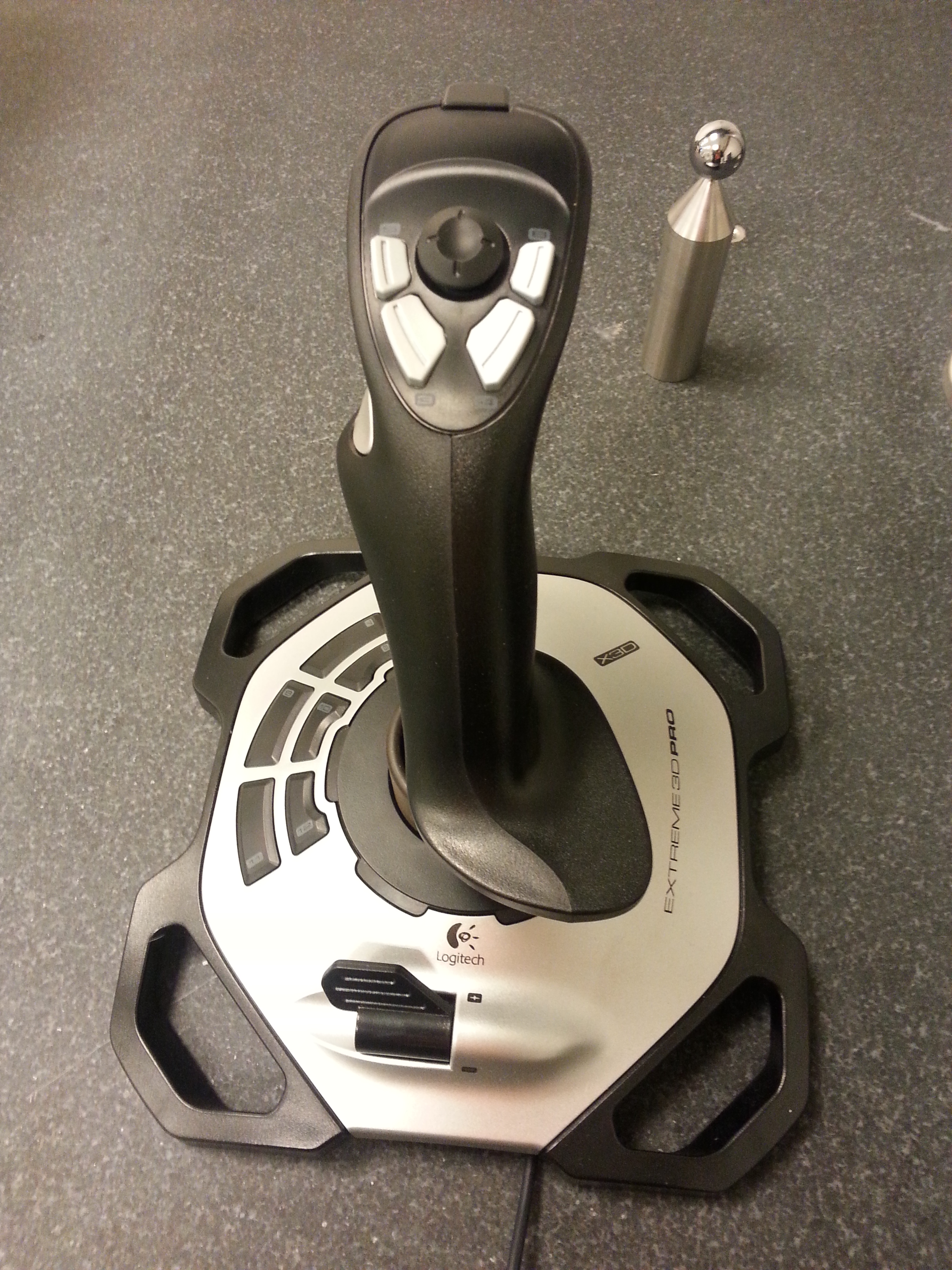
Joystick controller

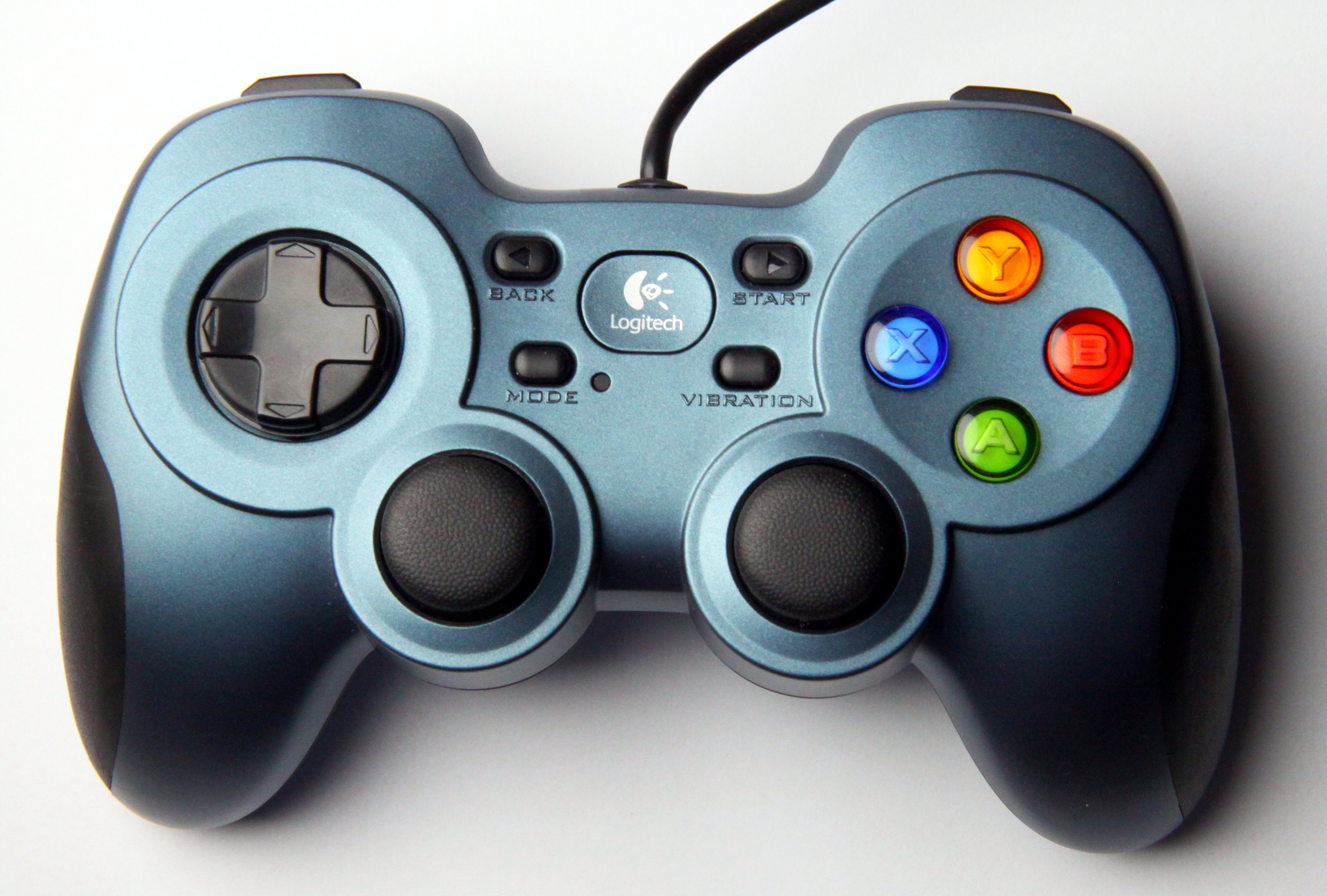
Gamepad (or joypad)

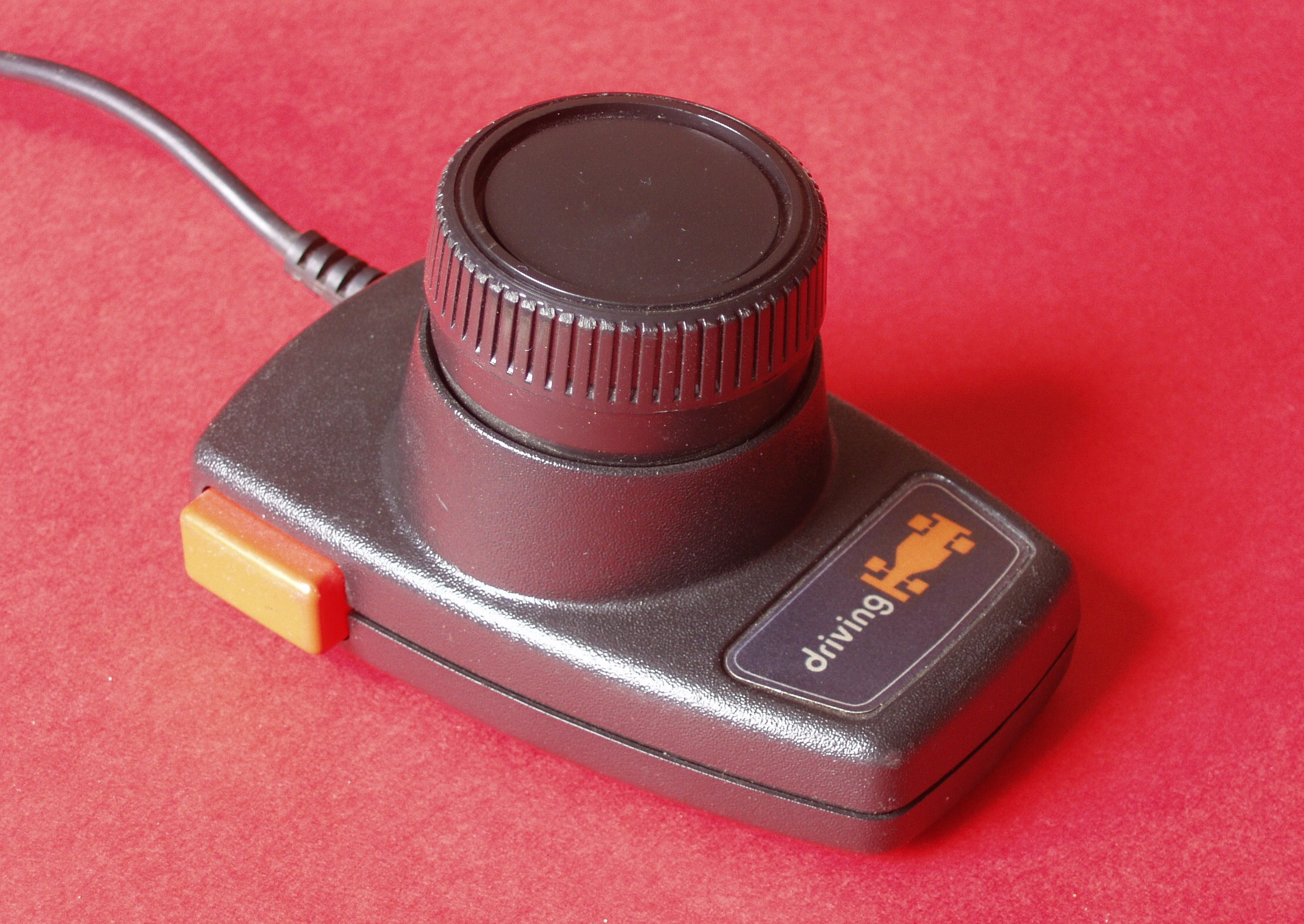
Paddle (game controller)

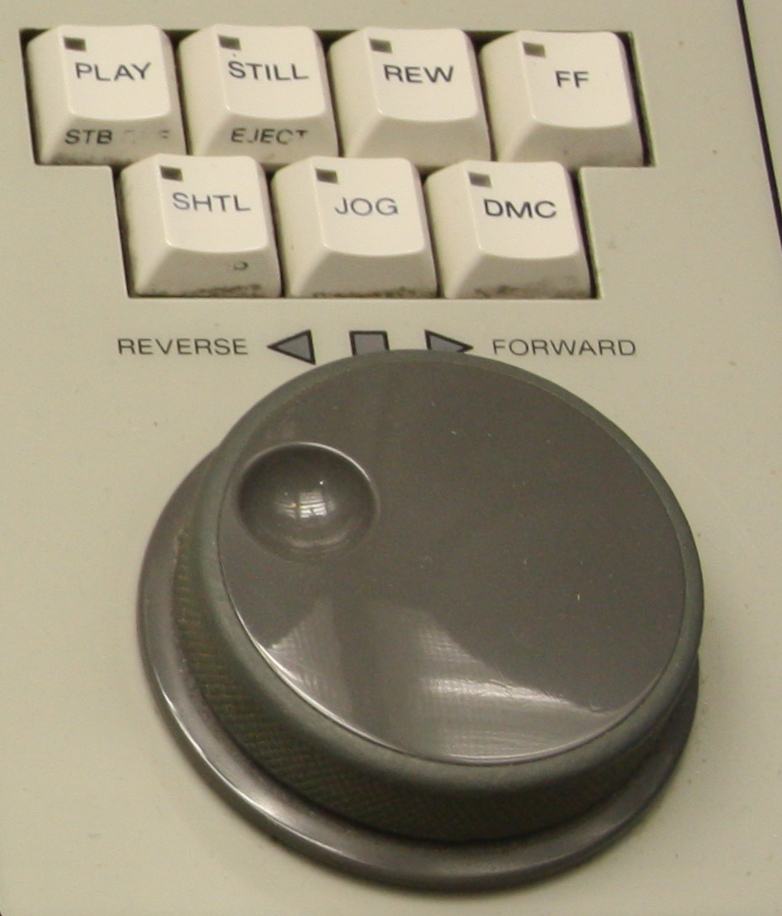
Jog dial/shuttle (or knob)

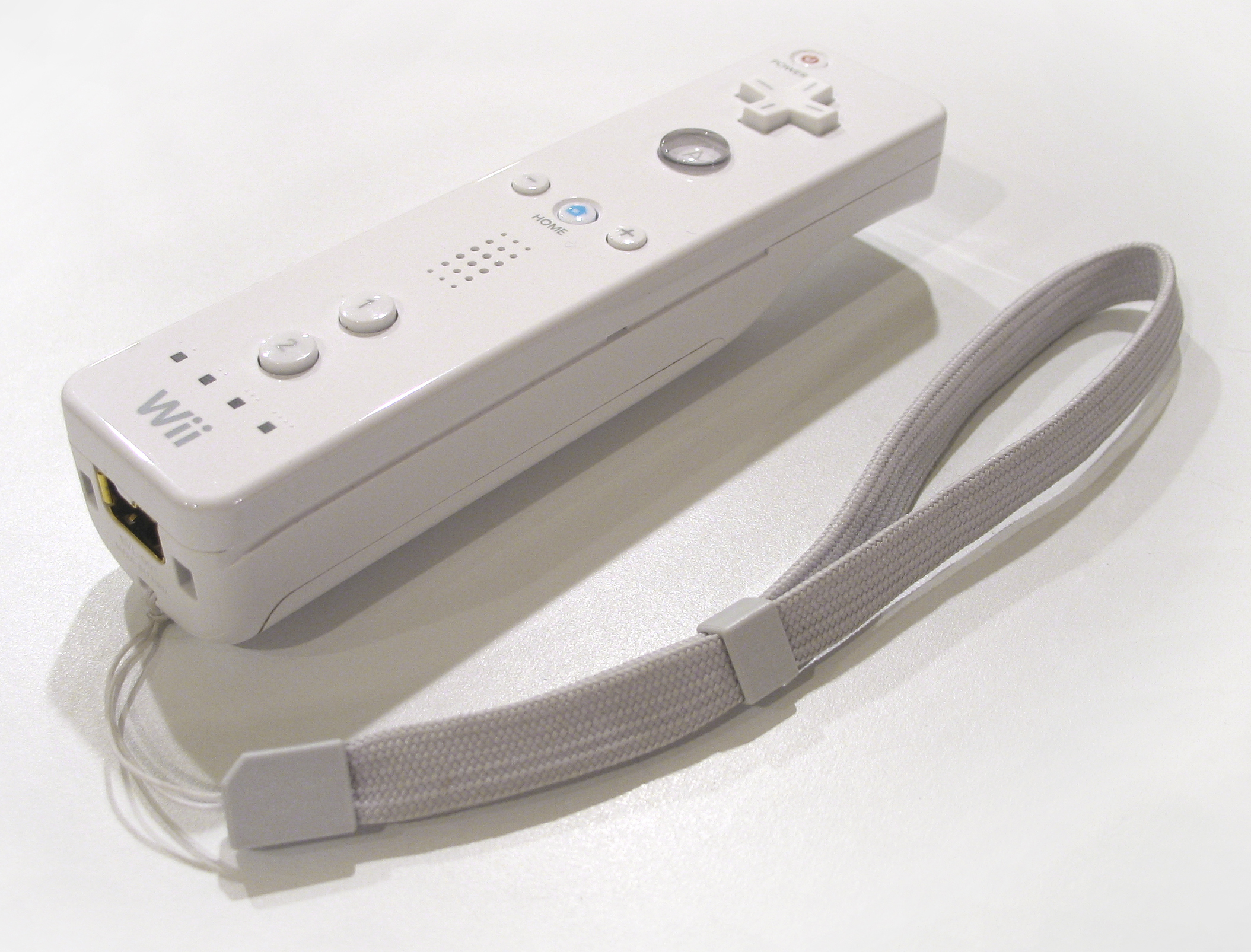
Wii Remote

== Video input devices ==
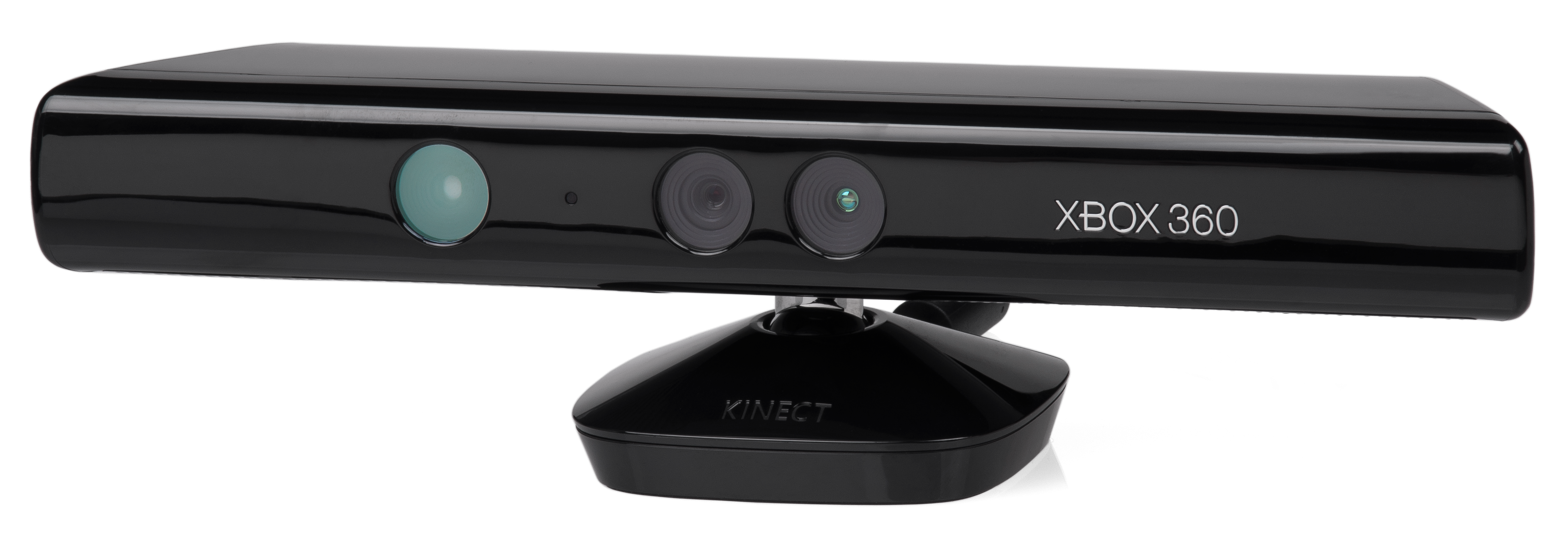
Microsoft Kinect sensor, works by detecting human motion visually

Video input devices are used to digitize images or video from the outside world into the computer. The information can be stored in a multitude of formats depending on the user's requirement.

Many video input devices use a camera sensor.

=== Types ===
- Digital camera
- Digital camcorder
- Portable media player
- Webcam
- Microsoft Kinect Sensor
- Image scanner
- Fingerprint scanner
- Barcode reader
- 3D scanner
- Laser rangefinder
- Eye gaze tracker

== Voice recorder ==
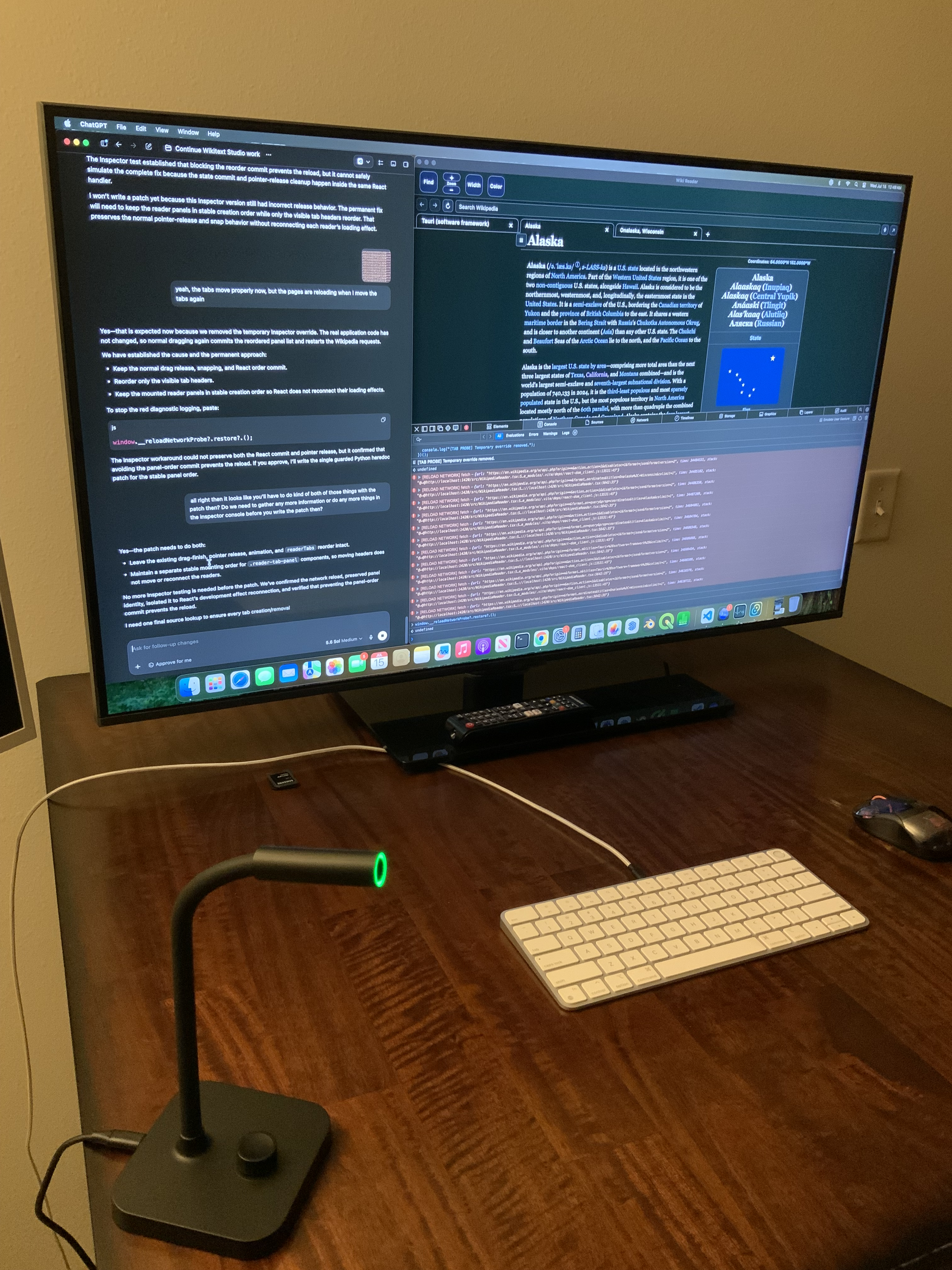
Microphone to chat with Codex with voice to text

Voice input devices are used to capture sound. In some cases, an audio output device can be used as an input device, in order to capture produced sound. Audio input devices allow a user to send audio info to a computer for processing, recording, or carrying out commands. Devices such as microphones allow users to speak to the computer in order to record a voice message or navigate software. Aside from recording, audio input devices are also used with speech recognition software.

=== Types ===
- Microphones
- MIDI keyboard or other digital musical instrument

== Punched paper ==
Punched cards and punched tapes were used often in the 20th century. A punched hole represented a one; its absence represented a zero. A mechanical or optical reader was used to input a punched card or tape.

== Other types ==
- Gesture recognition
- Digital pen
- Magnetic ink character recognition
- Sip-and-puff#Computer input device

== See also ==
- Display device
- Peripheral
